This is a partial list of unnumbered minor planets for principal provisional designations assigned during 1–15 September 2002. Since this period yielded a high number of provisional discoveries, it is further split into several standalone pages. , a total of 444 bodies remain unnumbered for this period. Objects for this year are listed on the following pages: A–B · C · D–F · G–K · L–O · P · Qi · Qii · Ri · Rii · S · Ti · Tii · U–V and W–Y. Also see previous and next year.

R 

|- id="2002 RB" bgcolor=#FFC2E0
| 0 || 2002 RB || AMO || 20.8 || data-sort-value="0.25" | 250 m || multiple || 2002–2015 || 15 Oct 2015 || 109 || align=left | Disc.: NEAT || 
|- id="2002 RR" bgcolor=#d6d6d6
| 0 || 2002 RR || MBA-O || 15.9 || 3.7 km || multiple || 2002–2021 || 24 Jan 2021 || 296 || align=left | Disc.: Area 52 Obs. || 
|- id="2002 RT" bgcolor=#FFC2E0
| 4 || 2002 RT || APO || 20.9 || data-sort-value="0.23" | 230 m || multiple || 2002–2013 || 02 Sep 2013 || 70 || align=left | Disc.: NEAT || 
|- id="2002 RU" bgcolor=#FA8072
| 5 || 2002 RU || MCA || 19.2 || data-sort-value="0.43" | 430 m || single || 80 days || 22 Nov 2002 || 37 || align=left | Disc.: NEAT || 
|- id="2002 RV" bgcolor=#FA8072
| 2 || 2002 RV || MCA || 18.7 || data-sort-value="0.54" | 540 m || multiple || 2001–2017 || 08 Oct 2017 || 47 || align=left | Disc.: NEAT || 
|- id="2002 RJ1" bgcolor=#E9E9E9
| 0 ||  || MBA-M || 17.63 || 1.3 km || multiple || 2002–2022 || 26 Jan 2022 || 108 || align=left | Disc.: AMOS || 
|- id="2002 RM1" bgcolor=#E9E9E9
| 0 ||  || MBA-M || 16.39 || 1.6 km || multiple || 2002–2021 || 11 May 2021 || 326 || align=left | Disc.: NEAT || 
|- id="2002 RO1" bgcolor=#E9E9E9
| 2 ||  || MBA-M || 18.3 || data-sort-value="0.92" | 920 m || multiple || 2002–2015 || 23 Sep 2015 || 45 || align=left | Disc.: NEATAlt.: 2015 RU85 || 
|- id="2002 RP1" bgcolor=#FA8072
| 1 ||  || MCA || 17.4 || 1.4 km || multiple || 1998–2021 || 04 Jan 2021 || 143 || align=left | Disc.: NEAT || 
|- id="2002 RO2" bgcolor=#d6d6d6
| 0 ||  || MBA-O || 16.9 || 2.3 km || multiple || 2002–2018 || 13 Aug 2018 || 75 || align=left | Disc.: LONEOSAlt.: 2012 KT35 || 
|- id="2002 RD3" bgcolor=#fefefe
| 0 ||  || MBA-I || 17.4 || data-sort-value="0.98" | 980 m || multiple || 2002–2021 || 16 Jan 2021 || 185 || align=left | Disc.: LONEOS || 
|- id="2002 RN4" bgcolor=#E9E9E9
| 0 ||  || MBA-M || 16.7 || 1.9 km || multiple || 2002–2019 || 25 Oct 2019 || 60 || align=left | Disc.: NEATAlt.: 2009 BB166 || 
|- id="2002 RQ5" bgcolor=#E9E9E9
| 0 ||  || MBA-M || 17.0 || 1.7 km || multiple || 1998–2020 || 22 Dec 2020 || 197 || align=left | Disc.: NEATAlt.: 2014 KV17 || 
|- id="2002 RX6" bgcolor=#E9E9E9
| 1 ||  || MBA-M || 17.4 || 1.4 km || multiple || 2002–2021 || 16 Jan 2021 || 149 || align=left | Disc.: AMOS || 
|- id="2002 RE7" bgcolor=#FA8072
| 0 ||  || HUN || 18.30 || data-sort-value="0.65" | 650 m || multiple || 2002–2021 || 17 Apr 2021 || 210 || align=left | Disc.: LPL/Spacewatch II || 
|- id="2002 RJ7" bgcolor=#d6d6d6
| 0 ||  || MBA-O || 16.3 || 3.1 km || multiple || 2002–2021 || 14 Jan 2021 || 103 || align=left | Disc.: George Obs. || 
|- id="2002 RV10" bgcolor=#E9E9E9
| 0 ||  || MBA-M || 17.2 || 1.5 km || multiple || 1998–2020 || 16 Dec 2020 || 131 || align=left | Disc.: NEAT || 
|- id="2002 RG23" bgcolor=#fefefe
| 0 ||  || MBA-I || 17.64 || data-sort-value="0.88" | 880 m || multiple || 2002–2021 || 08 Dec 2021 || 246 || align=left | Disc.: LONEOSAlt.: 2013 RF92 || 
|- id="2002 RR25" bgcolor=#FFC2E0
| 0 ||  || ATE || 21.09 || data-sort-value="0.22" | 220 m || multiple || 2002–2021 || 27 Sep 2021 || 196 || align=left | Disc.: LONEOS || 
|- id="2002 RS25" bgcolor=#FFE699
| 5 ||  || Asteroid || 19.5 || data-sort-value="0.70" | 700 m || single || 47 days || 06 Oct 2002 || 40 || align=left | Disc.: LONEOSMCA at MPC || 
|- id="2002 RN26" bgcolor=#d6d6d6
| 0 ||  || MBA-O || 15.7 || 4.0 km || multiple || 1999–2021 || 18 Jan 2021 || 256 || align=left | Disc.: NEATAlt.: 2013 OB9 || 
|- id="2002 RS26" bgcolor=#E9E9E9
| 0 ||  || MBA-M || 17.34 || 1.4 km || multiple || 2002–2022 || 09 Jan 2022 || 164 || align=left | Disc.: NEAT || 
|- id="2002 RZ26" bgcolor=#FA8072
| – ||  || MCA || 18.7 || data-sort-value="0.54" | 540 m || single || 46 days || 05 Oct 2002 || 31 || align=left | Disc.: LINEAR || 
|- id="2002 RD27" bgcolor=#FFC2E0
| 0 ||  || AMO || 18.07 || data-sort-value="0.86" | 860 m || multiple || 2002–2021 || 09 May 2021 || 149 || align=left | Disc.: LINEARNEO larger than 1 kilometer || 
|- id="2002 RU27" bgcolor=#d6d6d6
| 0 ||  || MBA-O || 16.07 || 3.4 km || multiple || 2002–2022 || 12 Jan 2022 || 215 || align=left | Disc.: LINEAR || 
|- id="2002 RL28" bgcolor=#E9E9E9
| 1 ||  || MBA-M || 18.1 || data-sort-value="0.71" | 710 m || multiple || 2002–2020 || 02 Feb 2020 || 38 || align=left | Disc.: LONEOS || 
|- id="2002 RO28" bgcolor=#FFC2E0
| 6 ||  || APO || 25.4 || data-sort-value="0.030" | 30 m || single || 90 days || 04 Dec 2002 || 22 || align=left | Disc.: LINEARAMO at MPC || 
|- id="2002 RQ28" bgcolor=#FFE699
| 5 ||  || Asteroid || 18.5 || 1.1 km || single || 42 days || 02 Oct 2002 || 42 || align=left | Disc.: LINEARMCA at MPC || 
|- id="2002 RG30" bgcolor=#FA8072
| 0 ||  || MCA || 18.48 || data-sort-value="0.60" | 600 m || multiple || 2002–2021 || 31 Oct 2021 || 144 || align=left | Disc.: LONEOS || 
|- id="2002 RC36" bgcolor=#E9E9E9
| 3 ||  || MBA-M || 17.6 || data-sort-value="0.90" | 900 m || multiple || 2002–2014 || 09 Jul 2014 || 43 || align=left | Disc.: LONEOSAlt.: 2006 QR21 || 
|- id="2002 RJ36" bgcolor=#fefefe
| 0 ||  || MBA-I || 17.6 || data-sort-value="0.90" | 900 m || multiple || 1995–2020 || 14 Nov 2020 || 254 || align=left | Disc.: LONEOS || 
|- id="2002 RB41" bgcolor=#fefefe
| 1 ||  || MBA-I || 18.1 || data-sort-value="0.71" | 710 m || multiple || 2002–2019 || 05 Oct 2019 || 106 || align=left | Disc.: LINEAR || 
|- id="2002 RJ45" bgcolor=#E9E9E9
| 0 ||  || MBA-M || 17.3 || 1.5 km || multiple || 2002–2021 || 09 Jan 2021 || 130 || align=left | Disc.: LINEAR || 
|- id="2002 RH53" bgcolor=#E9E9E9
| 0 ||  || MBA-M || 17.20 || 1.1 km || multiple || 2002–2021 || 15 Apr 2021 || 103 || align=left | Disc.: LINEAR || 
|- id="2002 RF60" bgcolor=#fefefe
| 0 ||  || MBA-I || 18.6 || data-sort-value="0.57" | 570 m || multiple || 2002–2019 || 17 Dec 2019 || 55 || align=left | Disc.: LONEOSAlt.: 2012 PF26 || 
|- id="2002 RY65" bgcolor=#E9E9E9
| 0 ||  || MBA-M || 18.57 || data-sort-value="0.81" | 810 m || multiple || 2001–2019 || 29 Jun 2019 || 70 || align=left | Disc.: Kitt Peak Obs.Alt.: 2001 FG241 || 
|- id="2002 RZ65" bgcolor=#d6d6d6
| 0 ||  || MBA-O || 16.42 || 2.9 km || multiple || 2000–2021 || 15 Apr 2021 || 221 || align=left | Disc.: KLENOTAlt.: 2002 RT111 || 
|- id="2002 RC66" bgcolor=#E9E9E9
| 0 ||  || MBA-M || 17.24 || 1.5 km || multiple || 2002–2020 || 11 Dec 2020 || 55 || align=left | Disc.: George Obs. || 
|- id="2002 RG66" bgcolor=#FA8072
| 0 ||  || MCA || 19.62 || data-sort-value="0.35" | 350 m || multiple || 2002–2022 || 06 Jan 2022 || 80 || align=left | Disc.: LINEAR || 
|- id="2002 RJ66" bgcolor=#fefefe
| 0 ||  || HUN || 17.74 || data-sort-value="0.84" | 840 m || multiple || 2002–2021 || 31 Oct 2021 || 180 || align=left | Disc.: LINEAR || 
|- id="2002 RJ67" bgcolor=#E9E9E9
| 0 ||  || MBA-M || 16.67 || 1.9 km || multiple || 2002–2021 || 07 Apr 2021 || 348 || align=left | Disc.: NEATAlt.: 2011 UQ194 || 
|- id="2002 RN70" bgcolor=#E9E9E9
| 1 ||  || MBA-M || 17.4 || data-sort-value="0.98" | 980 m || multiple || 2002–2020 || 05 Jan 2020 || 40 || align=left | Disc.: NEAT || 
|- id="2002 RJ72" bgcolor=#E9E9E9
| 0 ||  || MBA-M || 17.2 || 1.1 km || multiple || 2002–2019 || 08 Nov 2019 || 119 || align=left | Disc.: LINEAR || 
|- id="2002 RH74" bgcolor=#FA8072
| 0 ||  || MCA || 17.8 || data-sort-value="0.82" | 820 m || multiple || 2002–2021 || 08 Jun 2021 || 189 || align=left | Disc.: LINEAR || 
|- id="2002 RS74" bgcolor=#E9E9E9
| – ||  || MBA-M || 17.4 || data-sort-value="0.98" | 980 m || single || 37 days || 26 Sep 2002 || 25 || align=left | Disc.: LINEAR || 
|- id="2002 RL77" bgcolor=#fefefe
| 1 ||  || MBA-I || 18.5 || data-sort-value="0.59" | 590 m || multiple || 2002–2019 || 27 Oct 2019 || 80 || align=left | Disc.: LINEAR || 
|- id="2002 RQ77" bgcolor=#d6d6d6
| 0 ||  || MBA-O || 15.5 || 4.4 km || multiple || 1991–2021 || 17 Jan 2021 || 247 || align=left | Disc.: LINEARAlt.: 2015 BF273 || 
|- id="2002 RV78" bgcolor=#fefefe
| 2 ||  || MBA-I || 18.5 || data-sort-value="0.59" | 590 m || multiple || 2002–2020 || 15 Dec 2020 || 81 || align=left | Disc.: LINEAR || 
|- id="2002 RB85" bgcolor=#E9E9E9
| 2 ||  || MBA-M || 18.1 || data-sort-value="0.71" | 710 m || multiple || 2002–2014 || 27 Jun 2014 || 34 || align=left | Disc.: LINEARAlt.: 2006 QB14 || 
|- id="2002 RW90" bgcolor=#fefefe
| 1 ||  || MBA-I || 18.3 || data-sort-value="0.65" | 650 m || multiple || 2002–2020 || 10 Dec 2020 || 99 || align=left | Disc.: LINEAR || 
|- id="2002 RD109" bgcolor=#fefefe
| 1 ||  || MBA-I || 18.2 || data-sort-value="0.68" | 680 m || multiple || 2002–2020 || 21 Jan 2020 || 99 || align=left | Disc.: George Obs. || 
|- id="2002 RN109" bgcolor=#C2E0FF
| – ||  || TNO || 15.3 || 5.0 km || single || 80 days || 04 Nov 2002 || 38 || align=left | Disc.: LINEARLoUTNOs, damocloid || 
|- id="2002 RD111" bgcolor=#fefefe
| 0 ||  || MBA-I || 18.2 || data-sort-value="0.68" | 680 m || multiple || 2002–2019 || 20 Dec 2019 || 90 || align=left | Disc.: LINEARAlt.: 2015 JQ5 || 
|- id="2002 RU111" bgcolor=#fefefe
| 0 ||  || MBA-I || 18.59 || data-sort-value="0.57" | 570 m || multiple || 2002–2021 || 11 Jun 2021 || 129 || align=left | Disc.: Ondřejov Obs.Alt.: 2011 FG71 || 
|- id="2002 RF112" bgcolor=#FA8072
| 1 ||  || MCA || 18.5 || data-sort-value="0.59" | 590 m || multiple || 2002–2020 || 11 Dec 2020 || 58 || align=left | Disc.: LINEAR || 
|- id="2002 RW114" bgcolor=#fefefe
| 0 ||  || MBA-I || 17.1 || 1.1 km || multiple || 2002–2021 || 18 Jan 2021 || 231 || align=left | Disc.: LINEAR || 
|- id="2002 RC117" bgcolor=#FFC2E0
| 5 ||  || APO || 24.9 || data-sort-value="0.037" | 37 m || single || 15 days || 10 Sep 2002 || 48 || align=left | Disc.: LINEAR || 
|- id="2002 RU117" bgcolor=#E9E9E9
| 3 ||  || MBA-M || 18.0 || data-sort-value="0.75" | 750 m || multiple || 2002–2019 || 17 Dec 2019 || 51 || align=left | Disc.: Kvistaberg Obs. || 
|- id="2002 RA120" bgcolor=#E9E9E9
| 0 ||  || MBA-M || 17.3 || 1.5 km || multiple || 2002–2021 || 17 Jan 2021 || 191 || align=left | Disc.: AMOSAlt.: 2015 SH18 || 
|- id="2002 RB120" bgcolor=#E9E9E9
| 1 ||  || MBA-M || 16.9 || 3.1 km || multiple || 2002–2019 || 30 Oct 2019 || 49 || align=left | Disc.: NEATAlt.: 2010 GS150 || 
|- id="2002 RY123" bgcolor=#fefefe
| 0 ||  || MBA-I || 18.0 || data-sort-value="0.75" | 750 m || multiple || 2002–2020 || 10 Dec 2020 || 113 || align=left | Disc.: NEAT || 
|- id="2002 RC124" bgcolor=#E9E9E9
| 1 ||  || MBA-M || 17.3 || 1.5 km || multiple || 1993–2015 || 05 Dec 2015 || 71 || align=left | Disc.: NEAT || 
|- id="2002 RR124" bgcolor=#E9E9E9
| 0 ||  || MBA-M || 16.58 || 2.0 km || multiple || 2002–2021 || 02 Apr 2021 || 314 || align=left | Disc.: NEATAlt.: 2013 FE11 || 
|- id="2002 RS124" bgcolor=#FA8072
| 0 ||  || MCA || 18.7 || data-sort-value="0.54" | 540 m || multiple || 2002–2019 || 19 Dec 2019 || 59 || align=left | Disc.: NEAT || 
|- id="2002 RE125" bgcolor=#FA8072
| 1 ||  || MCA || 17.7 || data-sort-value="0.86" | 860 m || multiple || 1998–2020 || 02 Feb 2020 || 93 || align=left | Disc.: CINEOS || 
|- id="2002 RG125" bgcolor=#E9E9E9
| 2 ||  || MBA-M || 18.3 || 1.2 km || multiple || 2002–2020 || 20 Sep 2020 || 80 || align=left | Disc.: NEAT || 
|- id="2002 RJ125" bgcolor=#E9E9E9
| 0 ||  || MBA-M || 18.0 || 1.4 km || multiple || 2002–2020 || 21 Jun 2020 || 58 || align=left | Disc.: NEATAlt.: 2016 UV106 || 
|- id="2002 RK125" bgcolor=#E9E9E9
| – ||  || MBA-M || 17.6 || data-sort-value="0.90" | 900 m || single || 30 days || 03 Oct 2002 || 9 || align=left | Disc.: NEAT || 
|- id="2002 RL125" bgcolor=#E9E9E9
| 1 ||  || MBA-M || 18.0 || 1.4 km || multiple || 2002–2020 || 15 Oct 2020 || 113 || align=left | Disc.: NEAT || 
|- id="2002 RN125" bgcolor=#fefefe
| 0 ||  || MBA-I || 17.47 || data-sort-value="0.95" | 950 m || multiple || 2002–2021 || 30 Nov 2021 || 162 || align=left | Disc.: NEAT || 
|- id="2002 RV125" bgcolor=#E9E9E9
| 0 ||  || MBA-M || 17.55 || data-sort-value="0.92" | 920 m || multiple || 2002–2021 || 19 Apr 2021 || 47 || align=left | Disc.: CINEOSAdded on 22 July 2020 || 
|- id="2002 RZ125" bgcolor=#FFC2E0
| 7 ||  || APO || 19.8 || data-sort-value="0.39" | 390 m || single || 20 days || 30 Sep 2002 || 35 || align=left | Disc.: NEAT || 
|- id="2002 RA126" bgcolor=#FFC2E0
| 6 ||  || APO || 22.8 || data-sort-value="0.098" | 98 m || single || 17 days || 28 Sep 2002 || 27 || align=left | Disc.: NEATAMO at MPC || 
|- id="2002 RC126" bgcolor=#E9E9E9
| 0 ||  || MBA-M || 16.12 || 3.3 km || multiple || 1996–2021 || 12 Dec 2021 || 280 || align=left | Disc.: Kvistaberg Obs. || 
|- id="2002 RU127" bgcolor=#E9E9E9
| 1 ||  || MBA-M || 17.3 || 1.0 km || multiple || 2002–2020 || 23 Dec 2020 || 44 || align=left | Disc.: NEAT || 
|- id="2002 RD128" bgcolor=#fefefe
| 1 ||  || HUN || 17.7 || data-sort-value="0.86" | 860 m || multiple || 2002–2019 || 17 Nov 2019 || 116 || align=left | Disc.: NEATAlt.: 2012 BY89 || 
|- id="2002 RJ128" bgcolor=#E9E9E9
| 0 ||  || MBA-M || 17.3 || 1.5 km || multiple || 2002–2020 || 22 Nov 2020 || 116 || align=left | Disc.: NEAT || 
|- id="2002 RY128" bgcolor=#E9E9E9
| 0 ||  || MBA-M || 16.81 || 1.3 km || multiple || 1993–2021 || 11 Apr 2021 || 100 || align=left | Disc.: NEATAlt.: 2006 PR32, 2010 JV3 || 
|- id="2002 RO129" bgcolor=#E9E9E9
| 0 ||  || MBA-M || 17.4 || 1.8 km || multiple || 2002–2021 || 06 Jan 2021 || 172 || align=left | Disc.: Drebach Obs. || 
|- id="2002 RQ129" bgcolor=#E9E9E9
| 3 ||  || MBA-M || 17.6 || data-sort-value="0.90" | 900 m || multiple || 2002–2014 || 28 Jun 2014 || 45 || align=left | Disc.: AMOS || 
|- id="2002 RR129" bgcolor=#FFE699
| 8 ||  || Asteroid || 22.4 || data-sort-value="0.18" | 180 m || single || 16 days || 13 Sep 2002 || 24 || align=left | Disc.: NEATMCA at MPC || 
|- id="2002 RS129" bgcolor=#FFC2E0
| 0 ||  || APO || 22.85 || data-sort-value="0.096" | 96 m || multiple || 2002–2021 || 18 Jan 2021 || 63 || align=left | Disc.: NEAT || 
|- id="2002 RT129" bgcolor=#FFC2E0
| 0 ||  || APO || 19.67 || data-sort-value="0.41" | 410 m || multiple || 2002–2022 || 08 Jan 2022 || 185 || align=left | Disc.: NEAT || 
|- id="2002 RV129" bgcolor=#d6d6d6
| 0 ||  || MBA-O || 15.85 || 3.8 km || multiple || 2002–2021 || 02 Apr 2021 || 305 || align=left | Disc.: NEAT || 
|- id="2002 RZ129" bgcolor=#d6d6d6
| 2 ||  || MBA-O || 16.9 || 2.3 km || multiple || 2002–2019 || 29 Nov 2019 || 79 || align=left | Disc.: NEATAlt.: 2019 QN15 || 
|- id="2002 RB130" bgcolor=#FA8072
| 1 ||  || MCA || 18.9 || data-sort-value="0.49" | 490 m || multiple || 2002–2020 || 24 Mar 2020 || 93 || align=left | Disc.: NEAT || 
|- id="2002 RC130" bgcolor=#fefefe
| 0 ||  || MBA-I || 18.37 || data-sort-value="0.63" | 630 m || multiple || 2002–2021 || 08 Dec 2021 || 156 || align=left | Disc.: NEAT || 
|- id="2002 RE130" bgcolor=#d6d6d6
| 0 ||  || MBA-O || 16.98 || 2.2 km || multiple || 2002–2021 || 07 Apr 2021 || 81 || align=left | Disc.: NEATAdded on 11 May 2021Alt.: 2015 AD230 || 
|- id="2002 RF130" bgcolor=#d6d6d6
| 0 ||  || MBA-O || 15.9 || 3.7 km || multiple || 2002–2021 || 17 Jan 2021 || 243 || align=left | Disc.: AMOSAlt.: 2013 PH11 || 
|- id="2002 RP130" bgcolor=#d6d6d6
| 0 ||  || MBA-O || 16.25 || 3.1 km || multiple || 2002–2021 || 13 May 2021 || 215 || align=left | Disc.: AMOSAlt.: 2013 WD81 || 
|- id="2002 RT130" bgcolor=#fefefe
| 0 ||  || MBA-I || 19.12 || data-sort-value="0.45" | 450 m || multiple || 2002–2021 || 27 Sep 2021 || 91 || align=left | Disc.: NEATAlt.: 2015 XK20, 2018 TC10 || 
|- id="2002 RU130" bgcolor=#fefefe
| 1 ||  || MBA-I || 18.7 || data-sort-value="0.54" | 540 m || multiple || 2001–2020 || 26 Jan 2020 || 47 || align=left | Disc.: NEAT || 
|- id="2002 RA131" bgcolor=#d6d6d6
| 0 ||  || MBA-O || 16.56 || 2.7 km || multiple || 2002–2022 || 26 Jan 2022 || 152 || align=left | Disc.: NEAT || 
|- id="2002 RS132" bgcolor=#E9E9E9
| 0 ||  || MBA-M || 17.7 || 1.2 km || multiple || 2002–2020 || 22 Dec 2020 || 115 || align=left | Disc.: George Obs.Alt.: 2015 TA241 || 
|- id="2002 RK135" bgcolor=#E9E9E9
| 0 ||  || MBA-M || 17.1 || 1.6 km || multiple || 2000–2021 || 18 Jan 2021 || 174 || align=left | Disc.: AMOSAlt.: 2014 LY5 || 
|- id="2002 RO137" bgcolor=#FFC2E0
| 0 ||  || AMO || 20.50 || data-sort-value="0.28" | 280 m || multiple || 2002–2021 || 04 Dec 2021 || 344 || align=left | Disc.: AMOS || 
|- id="2002 RP137" bgcolor=#FFC2E0
| 2 ||  || AMO || 23.0 || data-sort-value="0.089" | 89 m || multiple || 2002–2017 || 24 Sep 2017 || 53 || align=left | Disc.: NEAT || 
|- id="2002 RS137" bgcolor=#fefefe
| 1 ||  || MBA-I || 19.0 || data-sort-value="0.47" | 470 m || multiple || 2002–2019 || 30 May 2019 || 45 || align=left | Disc.: NEAT || 
|- id="2002 RT137" bgcolor=#fefefe
| – ||  || MBA-I || 18.2 || data-sort-value="0.68" | 680 m || single || 3 days || 15 Sep 2002 || 9 || align=left | Disc.: NEAT || 
|- id="2002 RU137" bgcolor=#fefefe
| 0 ||  || MBA-I || 17.4 || data-sort-value="0.98" | 980 m || multiple || 2002–2020 || 04 Nov 2020 || 171 || align=left | Disc.: NEAT || 
|- id="2002 RX137" bgcolor=#E9E9E9
| 0 ||  || MBA-M || 17.4 || 1.4 km || multiple || 2002–2020 || 23 Dec 2020 || 86 || align=left | Disc.: NEATAlt.: 2011 UE57 || 
|- id="2002 RC138" bgcolor=#E9E9E9
| 0 ||  || MBA-M || 17.1 || 1.6 km || multiple || 2002–2021 || 05 Jan 2021 || 136 || align=left | Disc.: LINEARAlt.: 2011 UG43 || 
|- id="2002 RK138" bgcolor=#FA8072
| 1 ||  || MCA || 17.6 || 1.3 km || multiple || 2002–2020 || 26 Jan 2020 || 210 || align=left | Disc.: NEAT || 
|- id="2002 RM138" bgcolor=#E9E9E9
| 0 ||  || MBA-M || 17.07 || 1.1 km || multiple || 2002–2021 || 12 May 2021 || 152 || align=left | Disc.: NEAT || 
|- id="2002 RP140" bgcolor=#E9E9E9
| 0 ||  || MBA-M || 16.4 || 2.2 km || multiple || 1993–2021 || 18 Jan 2021 || 255 || align=left | Disc.: AMOSAlt.: 2011 YW || 
|- id="2002 RT140" bgcolor=#E9E9E9
| 0 ||  || MBA-M || 17.6 || 1.3 km || multiple || 2002–2021 || 08 Jan 2021 || 168 || align=left | Disc.: LONEOSAlt.: 2015 RJ30 || 
|- id="2002 RZ140" bgcolor=#fefefe
| 1 ||  || MBA-I || 18.0 || data-sort-value="0.75" | 750 m || multiple || 2002–2021 || 17 Jan 2021 || 82 || align=left | Disc.: NEAT || 
|- id="2002 RC142" bgcolor=#fefefe
| 0 ||  || MBA-I || 18.7 || data-sort-value="0.54" | 540 m || multiple || 2002–2020 || 16 Feb 2020 || 72 || align=left | Disc.: NEATAlt.: 2015 RG49 || 
|- id="2002 RO142" bgcolor=#fefefe
| 0 ||  || MBA-I || 18.3 || data-sort-value="0.65" | 650 m || multiple || 2002–2020 || 11 Dec 2020 || 83 || align=left | Disc.: NEAT || 
|- id="2002 RP142" bgcolor=#fefefe
| 2 ||  || MBA-I || 18.9 || data-sort-value="0.49" | 490 m || multiple || 2002–2017 || 27 Jan 2017 || 33 || align=left | Disc.: NEATAlt.: 2012 SY43 || 
|- id="2002 RB143" bgcolor=#E9E9E9
| 0 ||  || MBA-M || 18.0 || data-sort-value="0.75" | 750 m || multiple || 2002–2019 || 26 Nov 2019 || 35 || align=left | Disc.: NEATAlt.: 2010 HW116 || 
|- id="2002 RD143" bgcolor=#E9E9E9
| 0 ||  || MBA-M || 17.4 || 1.4 km || multiple || 2002–2019 || 22 Oct 2019 || 104 || align=left | Disc.: NEATAlt.: 2014 HY190 || 
|- id="2002 RO143" bgcolor=#d6d6d6
| 0 ||  || MBA-O || 16.66 || 2.6 km || multiple || 2002–2021 || 09 Apr 2021 || 107 || align=left | Disc.: NEATAlt.: 2018 SC8 || 
|- id="2002 RO144" bgcolor=#fefefe
| 0 ||  || MBA-I || 18.3 || data-sort-value="0.65" | 650 m || multiple || 2002–2020 || 27 Feb 2020 || 173 || align=left | Disc.: NEAT || 
|- id="2002 RY144" bgcolor=#fefefe
| 1 ||  || MBA-I || 19.4 || data-sort-value="0.39" | 390 m || multiple || 2002–2018 || 11 Jul 2018 || 50 || align=left | Disc.: NEATAlt.: 2015 TU192 || 
|- id="2002 RJ145" bgcolor=#E9E9E9
| 0 ||  || MBA-M || 17.5 || 1.8 km || multiple || 1993–2020 || 28 Jun 2020 || 62 || align=left | Disc.: NEAT || 
|- id="2002 RU145" bgcolor=#fefefe
| 0 ||  || MBA-I || 18.52 || data-sort-value="0.59" | 590 m || multiple || 2002–2022 || 06 Jan 2022 || 79 || align=left | Disc.: NEATAlt.: 2006 WT196 || 
|- id="2002 RL146" bgcolor=#fefefe
| 0 ||  || MBA-I || 19.28 || data-sort-value="0.41" | 410 m || multiple || 2002–2021 || 05 Nov 2021 || 199 || align=left | Disc.: NEATAlt.: 2002 UE63 || 
|- id="2002 RC147" bgcolor=#E9E9E9
| 1 ||  || MBA-M || 17.6 || data-sort-value="0.90" | 900 m || multiple || 2002–2020 || 28 Jan 2020 || 71 || align=left | Disc.: NEAT || 
|- id="2002 RL147" bgcolor=#E9E9E9
| 0 ||  || MBA-M || 17.2 || 1.5 km || multiple || 2002–2021 || 16 Jan 2021 || 169 || align=left | Disc.: NEATAlt.: 2011 UW193 || 
|- id="2002 RY147" bgcolor=#E9E9E9
| 1 ||  || MBA-M || 17.6 || data-sort-value="0.90" | 900 m || multiple || 2002–2019 || 02 Dec 2019 || 47 || align=left | Disc.: NEAT || 
|- id="2002 RP148" bgcolor=#fefefe
| 0 ||  || MBA-I || 18.60 || data-sort-value="0.57" | 570 m || multiple || 2002–2021 || 06 Apr 2021 || 93 || align=left | Disc.: NEATAlt.: 2009 WD156 || 
|- id="2002 RQ148" bgcolor=#E9E9E9
| 0 ||  || MBA-M || 17.1 || 1.6 km || multiple || 2002–2021 || 17 Jan 2021 || 199 || align=left | Disc.: NEATAlt.: 2011 WD151, 2014 KO57 || 
|- id="2002 RW148" bgcolor=#fefefe
| 0 ||  || MBA-I || 17.55 || data-sort-value="0.92" | 920 m || multiple || 2002–2021 || 14 Apr 2021 || 180 || align=left | Disc.: NEAT || 
|- id="2002 RB149" bgcolor=#d6d6d6
| 0 ||  || MBA-O || 16.5 || 2.8 km || multiple || 2002–2019 || 31 Dec 2019 || 80 || align=left | Disc.: NEAT || 
|- id="2002 RD149" bgcolor=#E9E9E9
| 0 ||  || MBA-M || 17.4 || 2.1 km || multiple || 2002–2020 || 22 Jan 2020 || 99 || align=left | Disc.: NEAT || 
|- id="2002 RN149" bgcolor=#d6d6d6
| 0 ||  || MBA-O || 16.3 || 3.1 km || multiple || 2002–2021 || 17 Jan 2021 || 159 || align=left | Disc.: AMOSAlt.: 2011 FK120 || 
|- id="2002 RX149" bgcolor=#E9E9E9
| 0 ||  || MBA-M || 17.6 || 1.3 km || multiple || 2002–2021 || 17 Jan 2021 || 129 || align=left | Disc.: AMOSAlt.: 2015 RO119 || 
|- id="2002 RY149" bgcolor=#fefefe
| 0 ||  || MBA-I || 18.1 || data-sort-value="0.71" | 710 m || multiple || 2002–2020 || 07 Dec 2020 || 114 || align=left | Disc.: AMOS || 
|- id="2002 RO150" bgcolor=#FA8072
| 2 ||  || MCA || 18.3 || data-sort-value="0.65" | 650 m || multiple || 2002–2020 || 01 Feb 2020 || 48 || align=left | Disc.: AMOS || 
|- id="2002 RX150" bgcolor=#d6d6d6
| 0 ||  || MBA-O || 16.6 || 2.7 km || multiple || 2002–2019 || 23 Dec 2019 || 139 || align=left | Disc.: NEATAlt.: 2013 RS58 || 
|- id="2002 RU151" bgcolor=#d6d6d6
| 0 ||  || MBA-O || 16.9 || 2.3 km || multiple || 2002–2019 || 18 Sep 2019 || 35 || align=left | Disc.: NEATAlt.: 2013 TR14 || 
|- id="2002 RV151" bgcolor=#E9E9E9
| 0 ||  || MBA-M || 17.2 || 1.5 km || multiple || 2002–2021 || 11 Jan 2021 || 99 || align=left | Disc.: NEATAlt.: 2015 TK52 || 
|- id="2002 RL152" bgcolor=#fefefe
| 0 ||  || MBA-I || 17.61 || data-sort-value="0.89" | 890 m || multiple || 2002–2021 || 09 May 2021 || 177 || align=left | Disc.: NEATAlt.: 2009 VA83, 2011 EZ72 || 
|- id="2002 RR152" bgcolor=#FA8072
| 0 ||  || HUN || 18.70 || data-sort-value="0.54" | 540 m || multiple || 1994–2022 || 10 Jan 2022 || 66 || align=left | Disc.: NEAT || 
|- id="2002 RV152" bgcolor=#fefefe
| 1 ||  || MBA-I || 17.4 || data-sort-value="0.98" | 980 m || multiple || 1998–2020 || 21 Mar 2020 || 82 || align=left | Disc.: NEAT || 
|- id="2002 RL153" bgcolor=#d6d6d6
| 0 ||  || MBA-O || 15.94 || 3.6 km || multiple || 2002–2021 || 12 May 2021 || 195 || align=left | Disc.: NEATAlt.: 2015 BR278 || 
|- id="2002 RR153" bgcolor=#fefefe
| 0 ||  || MBA-I || 18.2 || data-sort-value="0.68" | 680 m || multiple || 2002–2020 || 21 Mar 2020 || 123 || align=left | Disc.: NEATAlt.: 2015 SN7 || 
|- id="2002 RV153" bgcolor=#d6d6d6
| 0 ||  || MBA-O || 16.79 || 2.4 km || multiple || 2002–2021 || 08 May 2021 || 94 || align=left | Disc.: LPL/Spacewatch II || 
|- id="2002 RX153" bgcolor=#E9E9E9
| – ||  || MBA-M || 18.4 || data-sort-value="0.62" | 620 m || single || 22 days || 05 Oct 2002 || 14 || align=left | Disc.: LPL/Spacewatch II || 
|- id="2002 RM155" bgcolor=#E9E9E9
| 0 ||  || MBA-M || 16.49 || 2.1 km || multiple || 2002–2022 || 12 Jan 2022 || 173 || align=left | Disc.: NEATAlt.: 2013 CZ135 || 
|- id="2002 RW155" bgcolor=#E9E9E9
| 0 ||  || MBA-M || 17.9 || 1.1 km || multiple || 2002–2020 || 17 Dec 2020 || 37 || align=left | Disc.: NEATAlt.: 2015 TM167 || 
|- id="2002 RQ156" bgcolor=#d6d6d6
| 0 ||  || MBA-O || 16.2 || 3.2 km || multiple || 2002–2021 || 17 Jan 2021 || 177 || align=left | Disc.: NEAT || 
|- id="2002 RR157" bgcolor=#fefefe
| 0 ||  || MBA-I || 18.60 || data-sort-value="0.57" | 570 m || multiple || 2002–2021 || 27 Nov 2021 || 91 || align=left | Disc.: NEATAlt.: 2006 UT43 || 
|- id="2002 RW157" bgcolor=#E9E9E9
| 0 ||  || MBA-M || 16.8 || 1.8 km || multiple || 2002–2021 || 06 Jan 2021 || 193 || align=left | Disc.: NEATAlt.: 2011 VB1 || 
|- id="2002 RQ158" bgcolor=#fefefe
| 0 ||  || MBA-I || 18.30 || data-sort-value="0.65" | 650 m || multiple || 2001–2021 || 04 Aug 2021 || 101 || align=left | Disc.: NEATAlt.: 2015 TT273 || 
|- id="2002 RL160" bgcolor=#E9E9E9
| 0 ||  || MBA-M || 17.88 || data-sort-value="0.79" | 790 m || multiple || 2002–2021 || 08 May 2021 || 97 || align=left | Disc.: NEAT || 
|- id="2002 RQ160" bgcolor=#d6d6d6
| 1 ||  || MBA-O || 16.6 || 2.7 km || multiple || 2000–2019 || 25 Oct 2019 || 54 || align=left | Disc.: NEAT || 
|- id="2002 RZ160" bgcolor=#fefefe
| 0 ||  || MBA-I || 19.16 || data-sort-value="0.44" | 440 m || multiple || 2002–2021 || 11 Jul 2021 || 91 || align=left | Disc.: NEAT || 
|- id="2002 RK161" bgcolor=#E9E9E9
| 0 ||  || MBA-M || 17.8 || data-sort-value="0.82" | 820 m || multiple || 2002–2019 || 19 Nov 2019 || 85 || align=left | Disc.: NEATAlt.: 2006 PF35 || 
|- id="2002 RV161" bgcolor=#d6d6d6
| 0 ||  || MBA-O || 16.69 || 2.6 km || multiple || 1999–2021 || 19 May 2021 || 172 || align=left | Disc.: NEATAlt.: 2007 RD229 || 
|- id="2002 RK162" bgcolor=#d6d6d6
| 1 ||  || MBA-O || 17.1 || 2.1 km || multiple || 2002–2018 || 10 Oct 2018 || 77 || align=left | Disc.: NEATAlt.: 2017 FM19 || 
|- id="2002 RO162" bgcolor=#E9E9E9
| 0 ||  || MBA-M || 17.9 || 1.1 km || multiple || 2002–2019 || 01 Nov 2019 || 58 || align=left | Disc.: NEAT || 
|- id="2002 RV162" bgcolor=#E9E9E9
| 0 ||  || MBA-M || 17.69 || data-sort-value="0.86" | 860 m || multiple || 1998–2021 || 16 Mar 2021 || 107 || align=left | Disc.: NEATAlt.: 2015 XU252 || 
|- id="2002 RM163" bgcolor=#fefefe
| 0 ||  || MBA-I || 18.0 || data-sort-value="0.75" | 750 m || multiple || 2002–2020 || 16 Sep 2020 || 128 || align=left | Disc.: NEAT || 
|- id="2002 RN163" bgcolor=#fefefe
| 0 ||  || MBA-I || 19.0 || data-sort-value="0.47" | 470 m || multiple || 2002–2020 || 20 Oct 2020 || 81 || align=left | Disc.: NEAT || 
|- id="2002 RC164" bgcolor=#fefefe
| 2 ||  || MBA-I || 19.0 || data-sort-value="0.47" | 470 m || multiple || 2002–2019 || 05 Oct 2019 || 70 || align=left | Disc.: NEATAlt.: 2009 UU93 || 
|- id="2002 RG164" bgcolor=#E9E9E9
| 0 ||  || MBA-M || 17.8 || data-sort-value="0.82" | 820 m || multiple || 1994–2020 || 22 Mar 2020 || 115 || align=left | Disc.: NEAT || 
|- id="2002 RM164" bgcolor=#d6d6d6
| 0 ||  || MBA-O || 15.98 || 3.5 km || multiple || 2002–2022 || 26 Jan 2022 || 134 || align=left | Disc.: NEAT || 
|- id="2002 RO164" bgcolor=#fefefe
| 0 ||  || MBA-I || 18.0 || data-sort-value="0.75" | 750 m || multiple || 1995–2020 || 17 Oct 2020 || 144 || align=left | Disc.: NEAT || 
|- id="2002 RS164" bgcolor=#E9E9E9
| 0 ||  || MBA-M || 17.1 || 1.1 km || multiple || 1998–2021 || 03 Jun 2021 || 200 || align=left | Disc.: NEATAlt.: 2014 QA117 || 
|- id="2002 RB165" bgcolor=#E9E9E9
| 2 ||  || MBA-M || 18.5 || data-sort-value="0.84" | 840 m || multiple || 2002–2015 || 03 Nov 2015 || 109 || align=left | Disc.: NEATAlt.: 2015 RS95 || 
|- id="2002 RL165" bgcolor=#E9E9E9
| 0 ||  || MBA-M || 17.5 || 1.3 km || multiple || 2002–2019 || 22 Aug 2019 || 78 || align=left | Disc.: NEATAlt.: 2015 US61 || 
|- id="2002 RV165" bgcolor=#fefefe
| 0 ||  || MBA-I || 18.6 || data-sort-value="0.57" | 570 m || multiple || 2002–2019 || 05 Oct 2019 || 176 || align=left | Disc.: NEAT || 
|- id="2002 RM166" bgcolor=#E9E9E9
| 2 ||  || MBA-M || 18.1 || data-sort-value="0.71" | 710 m || multiple || 1998–2014 || 15 Aug 2014 || 40 || align=left | Disc.: NEAT || 
|- id="2002 RR166" bgcolor=#E9E9E9
| 0 ||  || MBA-M || 17.3 || 1.5 km || multiple || 1998–2021 || 18 Jan 2021 || 131 || align=left | Disc.: NEATAlt.: 2011 WM90 || 
|- id="2002 RS166" bgcolor=#fefefe
| 0 ||  || MBA-I || 18.2 || data-sort-value="0.68" | 680 m || multiple || 1995–2020 || 16 Oct 2020 || 133 || align=left | Disc.: NEATAlt.: 2013 RB27 || 
|- id="2002 RJ167" bgcolor=#d6d6d6
| 0 ||  || MBA-O || 16.9 || 2.3 km || multiple || 1997–2018 || 08 Nov 2018 || 59 || align=left | Disc.: SpacewatchAlt.: 1997 TM11 || 
|- id="2002 RM167" bgcolor=#d6d6d6
| 0 ||  || MBA-O || 16.8 || 2.4 km || multiple || 2002–2019 || 21 Jan 2019 || 98 || align=left | Disc.: NEATAlt.: 2018 TY12 || 
|- id="2002 RS167" bgcolor=#E9E9E9
| – ||  || MBA-M || 19.3 || data-sort-value="0.41" | 410 m || single || 17 days || 16 Sep 2002 || 12 || align=left | Disc.: NEAT || 
|- id="2002 RT167" bgcolor=#E9E9E9
| 0 ||  || MBA-M || 18.5 || data-sort-value="0.84" | 840 m || multiple || 2002–2020 || 13 Nov 2020 || 34 || align=left | Disc.: NEATAlt.: 2019 JP40 || 
|- id="2002 RE168" bgcolor=#E9E9E9
| 0 ||  || MBA-M || 18.33 || data-sort-value="0.64" | 640 m || multiple || 2002–2020 || 24 Jan 2020 || 66 || align=left | Disc.: NEATAlt.: 2016 AC69 || 
|- id="2002 RX168" bgcolor=#d6d6d6
| 0 ||  || MBA-O || 17.1 || 2.1 km || multiple || 2002–2018 || 01 Nov 2018 || 50 || align=left | Disc.: NEATAlt.: 2015 BK168 || 
|- id="2002 RB169" bgcolor=#E9E9E9
| 0 ||  || MBA-M || 17.7 || 1.2 km || multiple || 2002–2021 || 18 Jan 2021 || 119 || align=left | Disc.: NEATAlt.: 2015 TF197 || 
|- id="2002 RA170" bgcolor=#E9E9E9
| 0 ||  || MBA-M || 17.60 || data-sort-value="0.90" | 900 m || multiple || 2002–2021 || 06 Apr 2021 || 79 || align=left | Disc.: NEAT || 
|- id="2002 RA171" bgcolor=#d6d6d6
| 0 ||  || MBA-O || 16.59 || 2.7 km || multiple || 2002–2021 || 09 Apr 2021 || 124 || align=left | Disc.: NEAT || 
|- id="2002 RD172" bgcolor=#E9E9E9
| 0 ||  || MBA-M || 17.5 || 1.3 km || multiple || 2002–2020 || 10 Dec 2020 || 112 || align=left | Disc.: LONEOS || 
|- id="2002 RN173" bgcolor=#fefefe
| 0 ||  || MBA-I || 18.9 || data-sort-value="0.49" | 490 m || multiple || 1995–2020 || 16 Dec 2020 || 65 || align=left | Disc.: SpacewatchAlt.: 1995 UU81, 2016 QD4 || 
|- id="2002 RT175" bgcolor=#E9E9E9
| 0 ||  || MBA-M || 17.23 || 1.1 km || multiple || 2002–2021 || 03 May 2021 || 232 || align=left | Disc.: NEATAlt.: 2010 MO114 || 
|- id="2002 RA177" bgcolor=#E9E9E9
| 0 ||  || MBA-M || 17.4 || 1.4 km || multiple || 2002–2021 || 15 Jan 2021 || 80 || align=left | Disc.: NEAT || 
|- id="2002 RC177" bgcolor=#E9E9E9
| 1 ||  || MBA-M || 17.8 || data-sort-value="0.82" | 820 m || multiple || 2002–2021 || 09 Apr 2021 || 27 || align=left | Disc.: NEATAlt.: 2002 TU380, 2002 TR354, 2006 QN105 || 
|- id="2002 RG177" bgcolor=#d6d6d6
| 0 ||  || MBA-O || 16.65 || 2.6 km || multiple || 2002–2021 || 13 May 2021 || 155 || align=left | Disc.: NEATAlt.: 2002 TJ355, 2014 AP11 || 
|- id="2002 RH177" bgcolor=#FA8072
| 0 ||  || MCA || 18.6 || data-sort-value="0.57" | 570 m || multiple || 2002–2020 || 24 Jun 2020 || 92 || align=left | Disc.: NEAT || 
|- id="2002 RF178" bgcolor=#fefefe
| 0 ||  || MBA-I || 18.4 || data-sort-value="0.62" | 620 m || multiple || 2002–2020 || 24 Jul 2020 || 65 || align=left | Disc.: NEATAlt.: 2013 TF127 || 
|- id="2002 RZ178" bgcolor=#d6d6d6
| 0 ||  || MBA-O || 16.86 || 2.4 km || multiple || 2002–2021 || 03 May 2021 || 80 || align=left | Disc.: LPL/Spacewatch IIAlt.: 2015 CC36 || 
|- id="2002 RK179" bgcolor=#E9E9E9
| 1 ||  || MBA-M || 18.0 || 1.4 km || multiple || 2002–2020 || 11 Dec 2020 || 101 || align=left | Disc.: LPL/Spacewatch IIAlt.: 2011 SF133 || 
|- id="2002 RR179" bgcolor=#E9E9E9
| 1 ||  || MBA-M || 17.9 || 1.1 km || multiple || 2002–2019 || 27 Aug 2019 || 112 || align=left | Disc.: LPL/Spacewatch II || 
|- id="2002 RX180" bgcolor=#FA8072
| 2 ||  || MCA || 19.5 || data-sort-value="0.37" | 370 m || multiple || 2002–2016 || 25 Sep 2016 || 63 || align=left | Disc.: NEATAlt.: 2009 QB34 || 
|- id="2002 RY180" bgcolor=#E9E9E9
| 0 ||  || MBA-M || 16.96 || 2.3 km || multiple || 2002–2021 || 26 Nov 2021 || 173 || align=left | Disc.: NEATAlt.: 2015 FM325 || 
|- id="2002 RB181" bgcolor=#FA8072
| 2 ||  || HUN || 19.59 || data-sort-value="0.36" | 360 m || multiple || 2002–2021 || 16 Apr 2021 || 26 || align=left | Disc.: NEATAdded on 9 March 2021Alt.: 2016 GH216 || 
|- id="2002 RC181" bgcolor=#E9E9E9
| 0 ||  || MBA-M || 16.35 || 3.2 km || multiple || 2002–2022 || 25 Jan 2022 || 294 || align=left | Disc.: NEATAlt.: 2010 FG41 || 
|- id="2002 RD181" bgcolor=#fefefe
| 0 ||  || MBA-I || 17.7 || data-sort-value="0.86" | 860 m || multiple || 2002–2021 || 05 Jan 2021 || 223 || align=left | Disc.: AMOS || 
|- id="2002 RE181" bgcolor=#E9E9E9
| 1 ||  || MBA-M || 17.3 || 1.5 km || multiple || 2002–2019 || 29 Nov 2019 || 101 || align=left | Disc.: NEATAlt.: 2015 TB312 || 
|- id="2002 RJ181" bgcolor=#FA8072
| 0 ||  || HUN || 18.8 || data-sort-value="0.52" | 520 m || multiple || 1999–2020 || 23 Apr 2020 || 87 || align=left | Disc.: AMOS || 
|- id="2002 RK181" bgcolor=#FA8072
| – ||  || MCA || 17.8 || 1.5 km || single || 47 days || 31 Oct 2002 || 32 || align=left | Disc.: NEAT || 
|- id="2002 RO181" bgcolor=#FA8072
| 2 ||  || HUN || 19.1 || data-sort-value="0.45" | 450 m || multiple || 2002–2019 || 09 Apr 2019 || 51 || align=left | Disc.: NEATAlt.: 2019 GA3 || 
|- id="2002 RY181" bgcolor=#FA8072
| 0 ||  || MCA || 20.68 || data-sort-value="0.41" | 410 m || multiple || 2002–2021 || 30 Nov 2021 || 76 || align=left | Disc.: NEAT || 
|- id="2002 RZ181" bgcolor=#d6d6d6
| 0 ||  || MBA-O || 16.3 || 3.1 km || multiple || 2002–2021 || 11 Jan 2021 || 105 || align=left | Disc.: Michael Adrian Obs.Alt.: 2014 WD502 || 
|- id="2002 RA182" bgcolor=#FFC2E0
| 0 ||  || AMO || 20.76 || data-sort-value="0.25" | 250 m || multiple || 2002–2021 || 02 Oct 2021 || 87 || align=left | Disc.: NEAT || 
|- id="2002 RB182" bgcolor=#FFC2E0
| 7 ||  || APO || 23.1 || data-sort-value="0.085" | 85 m || single || 2 days || 16 Sep 2002 || 16 || align=left | Disc.: NEAT || 
|- id="2002 RN183" bgcolor=#FA8072
| 0 ||  || MCA || 16.91 || 1.7 km || multiple || 2002–2021 || 15 May 2021 || 384 || align=left | Disc.: NEAT || 
|- id="2002 RB184" bgcolor=#E9E9E9
| 0 ||  || MBA-M || 16.64 || 1.4 km || multiple || 2002–2021 || 07 Apr 2021 || 117 || align=left | Disc.: NEATAlt.: 2010 HH92 || 
|- id="2002 RG186" bgcolor=#E9E9E9
| 0 ||  || MBA-M || 18.1 || 1.0 km || multiple || 2002–2019 || 25 Nov 2019 || 95 || align=left | Disc.: NEATAlt.: 2015 XT106 || 
|- id="2002 RZ186" bgcolor=#E9E9E9
| 0 ||  || MBA-M || 17.51 || 1.3 km || multiple || 2002–2020 || 10 Dec 2020 || 135 || align=left | Disc.: NEATAlt.: 2015 RG84 || 
|- id="2002 RG188" bgcolor=#E9E9E9
| 0 ||  || MBA-M || 17.4 || 1.4 km || multiple || 2002–2021 || 12 Jan 2021 || 107 || align=left | Disc.: NEATAlt.: 2017 AR7 || 
|- id="2002 RO188" bgcolor=#fefefe
| 1 ||  || MBA-I || 18.0 || data-sort-value="0.75" | 750 m || multiple || 2002–2016 || 03 Apr 2016 || 40 || align=left | Disc.: NEAT || 
|- id="2002 RV189" bgcolor=#d6d6d6
| 0 ||  || MBA-O || 15.8 || 3.9 km || multiple || 2001–2021 || 12 Jan 2021 || 154 || align=left | Disc.: NEATAlt.: 2011 FN142 || 
|- id="2002 RR190" bgcolor=#E9E9E9
| 0 ||  || MBA-M || 17.88 || data-sort-value="0.79" | 790 m || multiple || 2002–2021 || 07 Feb 2021 || 76 || align=left | Disc.: NEAT || 
|- id="2002 RY190" bgcolor=#fefefe
| 1 ||  || MBA-I || 17.5 || data-sort-value="0.94" | 940 m || multiple || 2002–2020 || 15 Nov 2020 || 105 || align=left | Disc.: LINEAR || 
|- id="2002 RZ190" bgcolor=#E9E9E9
| 0 ||  || MBA-M || 16.9 || 2.3 km || multiple || 2002–2020 || 22 Aug 2020 || 102 || align=left | Disc.: LONEOS || 
|- id="2002 RA191" bgcolor=#E9E9E9
| 0 ||  || MBA-M || 16.8 || 1.8 km || multiple || 2002–2019 || 25 Nov 2019 || 224 || align=left | Disc.: AMOSAlt.: 2013 EM82 || 
|- id="2002 RE191" bgcolor=#E9E9E9
| 0 ||  || MBA-M || 17.02 || 2.2 km || multiple || 2002–2022 || 25 Jan 2022 || 84 || align=left | Disc.: AMOS || 
|- id="2002 RF191" bgcolor=#E9E9E9
| 0 ||  || MBA-M || 17.5 || data-sort-value="0.94" | 940 m || multiple || 2002–2020 || 21 Jan 2020 || 81 || align=left | Disc.: AMOS || 
|- id="2002 RM191" bgcolor=#E9E9E9
| 0 ||  || MBA-M || 18.0 || 1.1 km || multiple || 2002–2020 || 11 Dec 2020 || 97 || align=left | Disc.: Kvistaberg Obs.Alt.: 2015 TN234 || 
|- id="2002 RR191" bgcolor=#d6d6d6
| 0 ||  || MBA-O || 16.2 || 3.2 km || multiple || 2002–2021 || 16 Jan 2021 || 130 || align=left | Disc.: NEAT || 
|- id="2002 RT191" bgcolor=#d6d6d6
| 0 ||  || MBA-O || 16.4 || 2.9 km || multiple || 2002–2018 || 15 Sep 2018 || 63 || align=left | Disc.: NEAT || 
|- id="2002 RA192" bgcolor=#E9E9E9
| 1 ||  || MBA-M || 18.0 || 1.4 km || multiple || 2002–2020 || 17 Nov 2020 || 92 || align=left | Disc.: NEATAlt.: 2011 QB37 || 
|- id="2002 RB192" bgcolor=#fefefe
| 0 ||  || MBA-I || 18.09 || data-sort-value="0.72" | 720 m || multiple || 2002–2021 || 02 Oct 2021 || 96 || align=left | Disc.: NEAT || 
|- id="2002 RR192" bgcolor=#fefefe
| 0 ||  || MBA-I || 18.4 || data-sort-value="0.62" | 620 m || multiple || 1995–2020 || 12 Dec 2020 || 103 || align=left | Disc.: NEATAlt.: 2005 JA174 || 
|- id="2002 RS192" bgcolor=#E9E9E9
| 0 ||  || MBA-M || 16.8 || 1.8 km || multiple || 2002–2021 || 11 Jan 2021 || 137 || align=left | Disc.: NEATAlt.: 2011 SS110 || 
|- id="2002 RD193" bgcolor=#d6d6d6
| 0 ||  || MBA-O || 16.25 || 3.1 km || multiple || 1995–2021 || 12 May 2021 || 185 || align=left | Disc.: NEATAlt.: 2016 CQ260 || 
|- id="2002 RY193" bgcolor=#E9E9E9
| 2 ||  || MBA-M || 17.9 || 1.5 km || multiple || 2002–2020 || 15 Dec 2020 || 65 || align=left | Disc.: NEATAdded on 17 January 2021Alt.: 2011 SU70 || 
|- id="2002 RC194" bgcolor=#fefefe
| 0 ||  || MBA-I || 18.4 || data-sort-value="0.62" | 620 m || multiple || 2002–2020 || 10 Oct 2020 || 114 || align=left | Disc.: NEAT || 
|- id="2002 RF195" bgcolor=#E9E9E9
| 0 ||  || MBA-M || 17.5 || data-sort-value="0.94" | 940 m || multiple || 2002–2020 || 22 Jan 2020 || 81 || align=left | Disc.: NEAT || 
|- id="2002 RW195" bgcolor=#d6d6d6
| 0 ||  || MBA-O || 17.2 || 2.0 km || multiple || 2002–2018 || 31 Dec 2018 || 53 || align=left | Disc.: NEAT || 
|- id="2002 RG197" bgcolor=#E9E9E9
| 1 ||  || MBA-M || 17.3 || 1.0 km || multiple || 1998–2020 || 24 Jan 2020 || 98 || align=left | Disc.: NEATAlt.: 2013 EM95 || 
|- id="2002 RW197" bgcolor=#E9E9E9
| 0 ||  || MBA-M || 17.4 || data-sort-value="0.98" | 980 m || multiple || 1998–2020 || 26 Feb 2020 || 126 || align=left | Disc.: Farra d'Isonzo Obs.Alt.: 1998 SR42, 2008 FT19 || 
|- id="2002 RB199" bgcolor=#fefefe
| 0 ||  || MBA-I || 18.3 || data-sort-value="0.65" | 650 m || multiple || 2002–2017 || 09 Dec 2017 || 90 || align=left | Disc.: AMOSAlt.: 2002 RD178, 2017 XJ28 || 
|- id="2002 RF200" bgcolor=#E9E9E9
| 0 ||  || MBA-M || 17.0 || 1.7 km || multiple || 2002–2020 || 07 Dec 2020 || 108 || align=left | Disc.: NEAT || 
|- id="2002 RM201" bgcolor=#fefefe
| 0 ||  || MBA-I || 17.8 || data-sort-value="0.82" | 820 m || multiple || 2002–2020 || 17 Dec 2020 || 75 || align=left | Disc.: LINEAR || 
|- id="2002 RJ202" bgcolor=#d6d6d6
| 0 ||  || MBA-O || 15.8 || 3.9 km || multiple || 2001–2021 || 07 Jan 2021 || 172 || align=left | Disc.: NEATAlt.: 2007 JZ35, 2018 FG29 || 
|- id="2002 RO202" bgcolor=#FA8072
| 0 ||  || MCA || 18.45 || data-sort-value="0.61" | 610 m || multiple || 2002–2021 || 31 Oct 2021 || 212 || align=left | Disc.: NEAT || 
|- id="2002 RP204" bgcolor=#fefefe
| 0 ||  || MBA-I || 17.7 || data-sort-value="0.86" | 860 m || multiple || 1994–2017 || 17 Dec 2017 || 144 || align=left | Disc.: NEAT || 
|- id="2002 RC205" bgcolor=#d6d6d6
| 0 ||  || MBA-O || 16.4 || 2.9 km || multiple || 1992–2020 || 24 Jan 2020 || 126 || align=left | Disc.: NEATAlt.: 2015 BQ473 || 
|- id="2002 RD206" bgcolor=#E9E9E9
| 0 ||  || MBA-M || 16.72 || 2.7 km || multiple || 1993–2021 || 28 Nov 2021 || 161 || align=left | Disc.: NEATAlt.: 2010 MM57, 2011 QA72 || 
|- id="2002 RH206" bgcolor=#E9E9E9
| 0 ||  || MBA-M || 17.4 || 1.4 km || multiple || 2002–2019 || 30 Nov 2019 || 127 || align=left | Disc.: NEAT || 
|- id="2002 RP206" bgcolor=#fefefe
| 0 ||  || MBA-I || 18.2 || data-sort-value="0.68" | 680 m || multiple || 1995–2020 || 17 Dec 2020 || 95 || align=left | Disc.: NEATAlt.: 2013 WR9 || 
|- id="2002 RY206" bgcolor=#d6d6d6
| 0 ||  || MBA-O || 16.5 || 2.8 km || multiple || 2002–2018 || 06 Oct 2018 || 75 || align=left | Disc.: NEAT || 
|- id="2002 RQ207" bgcolor=#E9E9E9
| 0 ||  || MBA-M || 17.1 || 1.6 km || multiple || 2002–2021 || 04 Jan 2021 || 126 || align=left | Disc.: NEATAlt.: 2011 TT13 || 
|- id="2002 RB208" bgcolor=#d6d6d6
| 0 ||  || MBA-O || 16.8 || 2.4 km || multiple || 2002–2021 || 18 Jan 2021 || 84 || align=left | Disc.: NEATAlt.: 2008 UM264 || 
|- id="2002 RK208" bgcolor=#fefefe
| 3 ||  || MBA-I || 18.9 || data-sort-value="0.49" | 490 m || multiple || 2002–2020 || 15 Sep 2020 || 42 || align=left | Disc.: NEATAlt.: 2013 TY205 || 
|- id="2002 RL208" bgcolor=#E9E9E9
| 0 ||  || MBA-M || 18.3 || data-sort-value="0.65" | 650 m || multiple || 2002–2019 || 04 Dec 2019 || 52 || align=left | Disc.: NEAT || 
|- id="2002 RX208" bgcolor=#E9E9E9
| 0 ||  || MBA-M || 17.3 || 1.5 km || multiple || 2002–2021 || 18 Jan 2021 || 92 || align=left | Disc.: NEATAlt.: 2015 TM253 || 
|- id="2002 RZ208" bgcolor=#E9E9E9
| 0 ||  || MBA-M || 17.6 || data-sort-value="0.90" | 900 m || multiple || 1998–2021 || 08 May 2021 || 62 || align=left | Disc.: NEAT || 
|- id="2002 RA209" bgcolor=#d6d6d6
| 1 ||  || HIL || 16.1 || 4.4 km || multiple || 2002–2020 || 25 Jan 2020 || 97 || align=left | Disc.: NEATAlt.: 2010 MD103 || 
|- id="2002 RH209" bgcolor=#E9E9E9
| 0 ||  || MBA-M || 17.41 || 1.8 km || multiple || 1993–2022 || 25 Jan 2022 || 170 || align=left | Disc.: NEATAlt.: 2011 SN113, 2011 UQ292 || 
|- id="2002 RR209" bgcolor=#d6d6d6
| 0 ||  || MBA-O || 16.49 || 2.8 km || multiple || 2000–2021 || 03 May 2021 || 158 || align=left | Disc.: LPL/Spacewatch IIAlt.: 2010 HK49, 2015 BL363 || 
|- id="2002 RS209" bgcolor=#d6d6d6
| 0 ||  || MBA-O || 17.4 || 1.8 km || multiple || 2002–2019 || 28 Dec 2019 || 45 || align=left | Disc.: LPL/Spacewatch II || 
|- id="2002 RT209" bgcolor=#E9E9E9
| – ||  || MBA-M || 19.9 || data-sort-value="0.58" | 580 m || single || 3 days || 16 Sep 2002 || 16 || align=left | Disc.: LPL/Spacewatch II || 
|- id="2002 RW209" bgcolor=#E9E9E9
| 1 ||  || MBA-M || 17.8 || 1.2 km || multiple || 2002–2019 || 29 Sep 2019 || 76 || align=left | Disc.: LPL/Spacewatch IIAlt.: 2015 OP111 || 
|- id="2002 RX209" bgcolor=#d6d6d6
| 0 ||  || MBA-O || 16.8 || 2.4 km || multiple || 2002–2020 || 22 Dec 2020 || 74 || align=left | Disc.: LPL/Spacewatch II || 
|- id="2002 RZ209" bgcolor=#E9E9E9
| 0 ||  || MBA-M || 18.38 || 1.2 km || multiple || 2002–2021 || 06 Nov 2021 || 65 || align=left | Disc.: LPL/Spacewatch II || 
|- id="2002 RC210" bgcolor=#fefefe
| 1 ||  || MBA-I || 18.9 || data-sort-value="0.49" | 490 m || multiple || 2002–2020 || 22 Aug 2020 || 50 || align=left | Disc.: LPL/Spacewatch II || 
|- id="2002 RD210" bgcolor=#fefefe
| 0 ||  || MBA-I || 19.4 || data-sort-value="0.39" | 390 m || multiple || 2002–2020 || 15 Oct 2020 || 49 || align=left | Disc.: LPL/Spacewatch IIAlt.: 2013 UJ40 || 
|- id="2002 RF210" bgcolor=#E9E9E9
| 0 ||  || MBA-M || 18.1 || 1.0 km || multiple || 2002–2019 || 02 Nov 2019 || 58 || align=left | Disc.: LPL/Spacewatch II || 
|- id="2002 RG210" bgcolor=#E9E9E9
| 0 ||  || MBA-M || 18.29 || 1.2 km || multiple || 2002–2021 || 30 Nov 2021 || 50 || align=left | Disc.: LPL/Spacewatch II || 
|- id="2002 RO210" bgcolor=#E9E9E9
| 0 ||  || MBA-M || 17.37 || 1.9 km || multiple || 2002–2021 || 09 Nov 2021 || 99 || align=left | Disc.: LPL/Spacewatch IIAlt.: 2015 KL42 || 
|- id="2002 RS210" bgcolor=#d6d6d6
| 0 ||  || MBA-O || 16.6 || 2.7 km || multiple || 2002–2021 || 04 Jan 2021 || 53 || align=left | Disc.: LPL/Spacewatch II || 
|- id="2002 RX210" bgcolor=#fefefe
| 0 ||  || MBA-I || 18.1 || data-sort-value="0.71" | 710 m || multiple || 2002–2020 || 01 Jan 2020 || 127 || align=left | Disc.: LPL/Spacewatch II || 
|- id="2002 RY210" bgcolor=#d6d6d6
| 0 ||  || MBA-O || 17.3 || 1.9 km || multiple || 2002–2019 || 27 Nov 2019 || 64 || align=left | Disc.: LPL/Spacewatch II || 
|- id="2002 RD211" bgcolor=#d6d6d6
| 0 ||  || MBA-O || 17.1 || 2.1 km || multiple || 2002–2020 || 19 Dec 2020 || 45 || align=left | Disc.: NEATAlt.: 2008 ST303 || 
|- id="2002 RX213" bgcolor=#E9E9E9
| 0 ||  || MBA-M || 17.1 || 1.6 km || multiple || 2002–2019 || 26 Jul 2019 || 136 || align=left | Disc.: LINEARAlt.: 2015 OW74 || 
|- id="2002 RB215" bgcolor=#fefefe
| 0 ||  || MBA-I || 18.2 || data-sort-value="0.68" | 680 m || multiple || 2002–2019 || 29 Sep 2019 || 88 || align=left | Disc.: LINEARAlt.: 2009 VY73 || 
|- id="2002 RH215" bgcolor=#fefefe
| 0 ||  || MBA-I || 17.5 || data-sort-value="0.94" | 940 m || multiple || 2002–2021 || 17 Jan 2021 || 104 || align=left | Disc.: LINEARAlt.: 2013 YA58 || 
|- id="2002 RY215" bgcolor=#fefefe
| 0 ||  || MBA-I || 18.05 || data-sort-value="0.73" | 730 m || multiple || 2002–2021 || 11 May 2021 || 94 || align=left | Disc.: LONEOSAlt.: 2014 DA58 || 
|- id="2002 RX217" bgcolor=#fefefe
| 1 ||  || MBA-I || 18.6 || data-sort-value="0.57" | 570 m || multiple || 1995–2020 || 11 Dec 2020 || 108 || align=left | Disc.: NEAT || 
|- id="2002 RY217" bgcolor=#fefefe
| 0 ||  || MBA-I || 18.6 || data-sort-value="0.57" | 570 m || multiple || 2002–2020 || 05 Nov 2020 || 56 || align=left | Disc.: NEAT || 
|- id="2002 RG218" bgcolor=#fefefe
| 0 ||  || MBA-I || 17.6 || data-sort-value="0.90" | 900 m || multiple || 2002–2019 || 25 Oct 2019 || 87 || align=left | Disc.: AMOSAlt.: 2011 CT11 || 
|- id="2002 RK218" bgcolor=#fefefe
| 0 ||  || MBA-I || 17.9 || data-sort-value="0.78" | 780 m || multiple || 2000–2021 || 09 Jan 2021 || 117 || align=left | Disc.: AMOS || 
|- id="2002 RR218" bgcolor=#E9E9E9
| 0 ||  || MBA-M || 16.7 || 1.9 km || multiple || 2002–2021 || 18 Jan 2021 || 224 || align=left | Disc.: AMOSAlt.: 2011 YB || 
|- id="2002 RS218" bgcolor=#E9E9E9
| 2 ||  || MBA-M || 17.5 || data-sort-value="0.94" | 940 m || multiple || 2002–2019 || 30 Dec 2019 || 43 || align=left | Disc.: AMOS || 
|- id="2002 RD219" bgcolor=#fefefe
| 0 ||  || MBA-I || 18.7 || data-sort-value="0.54" | 540 m || multiple || 2002–2019 || 01 Nov 2019 || 104 || align=left | Disc.: NEAT || 
|- id="2002 RK219" bgcolor=#d6d6d6
| 0 ||  || MBA-O || 15.8 || 3.9 km || multiple || 2002–2021 || 18 Jan 2021 || 191 || align=left | Disc.: NEAT || 
|- id="2002 RM219" bgcolor=#fefefe
| 0 ||  || MBA-I || 17.8 || data-sort-value="0.82" | 820 m || multiple || 2002–2020 || 09 Dec 2020 || 65 || align=left | Disc.: NEAT || 
|- id="2002 RR219" bgcolor=#d6d6d6
| 0 ||  || MBA-O || 15.99 || 3.5 km || multiple || 2002–2021 || 14 Apr 2021 || 217 || align=left | Disc.: NEATAlt.: 2013 RO48 || 
|- id="2002 RG220" bgcolor=#d6d6d6
| 2 ||  || MBA-O || 17.4 || 1.8 km || multiple || 2002–2019 || 05 Jan 2019 || 62 || align=left | Disc.: NEAT || 
|- id="2002 RY220" bgcolor=#fefefe
| 0 ||  || MBA-I || 18.38 || data-sort-value="0.63" | 630 m || multiple || 2002–2021 || 08 May 2021 || 82 || align=left | Disc.: NEATAlt.: 2012 RA29 || 
|- id="2002 RZ221" bgcolor=#fefefe
| 0 ||  || MBA-I || 17.5 || data-sort-value="0.94" | 940 m || multiple || 2000–2021 || 11 Jan 2021 || 235 || align=left | Disc.: NEATAlt.: 2011 EV86 || 
|- id="2002 RD222" bgcolor=#E9E9E9
| 1 ||  || MBA-M || 17.3 || 1.0 km || multiple || 1998–2020 || 23 Jan 2020 || 54 || align=left | Disc.: AMOS || 
|- id="2002 RL222" bgcolor=#fefefe
| 0 ||  || MBA-I || 18.0 || data-sort-value="0.75" | 750 m || multiple || 2002–2020 || 22 Dec 2020 || 151 || align=left | Disc.: AMOS || 
|- id="2002 RU224" bgcolor=#d6d6d6
| 0 ||  || MBA-O || 16.2 || 3.2 km || multiple || 2002–2021 || 15 Jan 2021 || 148 || align=left | Disc.: NEATAlt.: 2005 EZ253, 2005 FE15 || 
|- id="2002 RA225" bgcolor=#E9E9E9
| 0 ||  || MBA-M || 17.44 || data-sort-value="0.97" | 970 m || multiple || 2002–2021 || 17 Apr 2021 || 107 || align=left | Disc.: NEAT || 
|- id="2002 RJ225" bgcolor=#E9E9E9
| 1 ||  || MBA-M || 17.0 || 1.2 km || multiple || 1996–2021 || 01 Jun 2021 || 47 || align=left | Disc.: NEATAlt.: 2010 KK53 || 
|- id="2002 RQ225" bgcolor=#E9E9E9
| 0 ||  || MBA-M || 17.59 || data-sort-value="0.90" | 900 m || multiple || 2002–2021 || 17 Apr 2021 || 117 || align=left | Disc.: NEATAlt.: 2006 QK93 || 
|- id="2002 RR225" bgcolor=#fefefe
| 0 ||  || MBA-I || 18.0 || data-sort-value="0.75" | 750 m || multiple || 2002–2020 || 11 Dec 2020 || 101 || align=left | Disc.: NEAT || 
|- id="2002 RJ227" bgcolor=#fefefe
| 0 ||  || MBA-I || 18.1 || data-sort-value="0.71" | 710 m || multiple || 2000–2020 || 07 Dec 2020 || 166 || align=left | Disc.: NEATAlt.: 2013 VM21 || 
|- id="2002 RO227" bgcolor=#E9E9E9
| 0 ||  || MBA-M || 17.1 || 1.6 km || multiple || 2002–2021 || 14 Jan 2021 || 172 || align=left | Disc.: NEATAlt.: 2015 RO202 || 
|- id="2002 RS229" bgcolor=#fefefe
| 1 ||  || MBA-I || 18.8 || data-sort-value="0.52" | 520 m || multiple || 2002–2019 || 27 Oct 2019 || 49 || align=left | Disc.: AMOS || 
|- id="2002 RQ230" bgcolor=#fefefe
| 0 ||  || MBA-I || 17.7 || data-sort-value="0.86" | 860 m || multiple || 2002–2021 || 18 Jan 2021 || 141 || align=left | Disc.: NEATAlt.: 2015 FL42 || 
|- id="2002 RB231" bgcolor=#fefefe
| 0 ||  || MBA-I || 17.8 || data-sort-value="0.82" | 820 m || multiple || 2002–2020 || 11 Dec 2020 || 90 || align=left | Disc.: AMOSAlt.: 2009 TJ27 || 
|- id="2002 RL231" bgcolor=#E9E9E9
| 0 ||  || MBA-M || 17.15 || 1.1 km || multiple || 1998–2021 || 14 May 2021 || 178 || align=left | Disc.: NEATAlt.: 2012 BE74 || 
|- id="2002 RN232" bgcolor=#d6d6d6
| 2 ||  || HIL || 16.7 || 2.5 km || multiple || 2002–2018 || 05 Oct 2018 || 51 || align=left | Disc.: NEATAlt.: 2010 SA11 || 
|- id="2002 RP232" bgcolor=#fefefe
| 0 ||  || MBA-I || 17.92 || data-sort-value="0.77" | 770 m || multiple || 2002–2021 || 13 May 2021 || 138 || align=left | Disc.: NEAT || 
|-  id="2002 RS232" bgcolor=#d6d6d6
| 0 ||  || MBA-O || 16.6 || 2.7 km || multiple || 2002–2019 || 21 Oct 2019 || 85 || align=left | Disc.: NEAT || 
|- id="2002 RT232" bgcolor=#fefefe
| 1 ||  || MBA-I || 19.45 || data-sort-value="0.34" | 390 m || multiple || 2002-2022 || 14 Nov 2022 || 64 || align=left | Disc.: NEATAlt.: 2002 SX61 || 
|- id="2002 RL234" bgcolor=#fefefe
| 0 ||  || MBA-I || 18.84 || data-sort-value="0.51" | 510 m || multiple || 2002–2021 || 14 Jul 2021 || 65 || align=left | Disc.: NEATAlt.: 2015 OT29 || 
|- id="2002 RP234" bgcolor=#FA8072
| – ||  || MCA || 18.7 || data-sort-value="0.54" | 540 m || single || 26 days || 15 Sep 2002 || 16 || align=left | Disc.: NEAT || 
|- id="2002 RR234" bgcolor=#E9E9E9
| 0 ||  || MBA-M || 17.20 || 1.1 km || multiple || 2002–2021 || 13 Apr 2021 || 125 || align=left | Disc.: NEATAlt.: 2017 FP24 || 
|- id="2002 RY234" bgcolor=#d6d6d6
| 0 ||  || MBA-O || 15.9 || 3.7 km || multiple || 2002–2021 || 18 Jan 2021 || 168 || align=left | Disc.: NEATAlt.: 2013 TE76 || 
|- id="2002 RJ235" bgcolor=#E9E9E9
| 0 ||  || MBA-M || 17.6 || 1.7 km || multiple || 2002–2021 || 08 Nov 2021 || 68 || align=left | Disc.: NEATAdded on 5 November 2021Alt.: 2016 PY225 || 
|- id="2002 RY235" bgcolor=#d6d6d6
| 0 ||  || MBA-O || 16.66 || 2.6 km || multiple || 2002–2022 || 27 Jan 2022 || 53 || align=left | Disc.: NEAT || 
|- id="2002 RD236" bgcolor=#E9E9E9
| 1 ||  || MBA-M || 17.5 || 1.3 km || multiple || 2002–2021 || 14 Jan 2021 || 68 || align=left | Disc.: NEAT || 
|- id="2002 RH236" bgcolor=#fefefe
| 1 ||  || MBA-I || 18.9 || data-sort-value="0.49" | 490 m || multiple || 2002–2018 || 15 Sep 2018 || 69 || align=left | Disc.: NEAT || 
|- id="2002 RK236" bgcolor=#fefefe
| 1 ||  || MBA-I || 18.0 || data-sort-value="0.75" | 750 m || multiple || 2002–2021 || 04 Jan 2021 || 74 || align=left | Disc.: NEAT || 
|- id="2002 RS236" bgcolor=#E9E9E9
| 1 ||  || MBA-M || 18.4 || data-sort-value="0.88" | 880 m || multiple || 2002–2019 || 25 Sep 2019 || 41 || align=left | Disc.: NEAT || 
|- id="2002 RW236" bgcolor=#fefefe
| 0 ||  || MBA-I || 18.3 || data-sort-value="0.65" | 650 m || multiple || 2002–2016 || 19 Oct 2016 || 64 || align=left | Disc.: NEATAlt.: 2015 FT217 || 
|- id="2002 RY236" bgcolor=#E9E9E9
| 2 ||  || MBA-M || 18.0 || 1.1 km || multiple || 1998–2019 || 03 Oct 2019 || 51 || align=left | Disc.: NEATAlt.: 2015 TV258 || 
|- id="2002 RB238" bgcolor=#E9E9E9
| – ||  || MBA-M || 19.2 || data-sort-value="0.80" | 800 m || single || 19 days || 16 Sep 2002 || 14 || align=left | Disc.: NEAT || 
|- id="2002 RC238" bgcolor=#d6d6d6
| 2 ||  || MBA-O || 16.3 || 3.1 km || multiple || 2002–2019 || 28 Oct 2019 || 38 || align=left | Disc.: NEAT || 
|- id="2002 RM238" bgcolor=#fefefe
| 2 ||  || MBA-I || 18.4 || data-sort-value="0.62" | 620 m || multiple || 2002–2018 || 15 Dec 2018 || 44 || align=left | Disc.: NEATAlt.: 2006 US323 || 
|- id="2002 RN238" bgcolor=#fefefe
| 0 ||  || MBA-I || 18.4 || data-sort-value="0.62" | 620 m || multiple || 2002–2021 || 12 Jan 2021 || 57 || align=left | Disc.: NEAT || 
|- id="2002 RP238" bgcolor=#d6d6d6
| 0 ||  || MBA-O || 15.74 || 4.0 km || multiple || 2002–2022 || 13 Jan 2022 || 258 || align=left | Disc.: NEATAlt.: 2010 EU116, 2011 FS65 || 
|- id="2002 RT238" bgcolor=#E9E9E9
| 0 ||  || MBA-M || 17.61 || 1.3 km || multiple || 2002–2021 || 19 Mar 2021 || 142 || align=left | Disc.: NEAT || 
|- id="2002 RV238" bgcolor=#d6d6d6
| 0 ||  || MBA-O || 16.77 || 2.5 km || multiple || 1994–2021 || 03 May 2021 || 53 || align=left | Disc.: NEAT || 
|- id="2002 RO239" bgcolor=#E9E9E9
| 0 ||  || MBA-M || 16.9 || 1.8 km || multiple || 2002–2021 || 16 Jan 2021 || 179 || align=left | Disc.: NEATAlt.: 2013 CR172 || 
|- id="2002 RP239" bgcolor=#d6d6d6
| 0 ||  || MBA-O || 16.3 || 3.1 km || multiple || 2002–2021 || 16 Jan 2021 || 116 || align=left | Disc.: NEATAlt.: 2016 CV51 || 
|- id="2002 RH240" bgcolor=#d6d6d6
| 0 ||  || MBA-O || 16.7 || 2.5 km || multiple || 2002–2019 || 26 Nov 2019 || 67 || align=left | Disc.: NEATAlt.: 2008 UB113 || 
|- id="2002 RU240" bgcolor=#fefefe
| 0 ||  || MBA-I || 18.59 || data-sort-value="0.57" | 570 m || multiple || 2002–2019 || 07 Jun 2019 || 58 || align=left | Disc.: NEAT || 
|- id="2002 RX240" bgcolor=#d6d6d6
| 0 ||  || MBA-O || 16.2 || 3.2 km || multiple || 2002–2018 || 10 Oct 2018 || 70 || align=left | Disc.: NEAT || 
|- id="2002 RY240" bgcolor=#fefefe
| 0 ||  || MBA-I || 18.5 || data-sort-value="0.59" | 590 m || multiple || 2002–2019 || 23 Sep 2019 || 77 || align=left | Disc.: NEATAlt.: 2009 RP68 || 
|- id="2002 RC241" bgcolor=#d6d6d6
| 0 ||  || MBA-O || 16.9 || 2.3 km || multiple || 2002–2020 || 21 Jan 2020 || 70 || align=left | Disc.: NEATAlt.: 2013 TM87 || 
|- id="2002 RL241" bgcolor=#E9E9E9
| 4 ||  || MBA-M || 18.2 || data-sort-value="0.68" | 680 m || multiple || 2002–2019 || 28 Nov 2019 || 24 || align=left | Disc.: NEAT || 
|- id="2002 RM241" bgcolor=#d6d6d6
| 0 ||  || MBA-O || 16.4 || 2.9 km || multiple || 2002–2020 || 29 Jan 2020 || 66 || align=left | Disc.: NEAT || 
|- id="2002 RQ241" bgcolor=#E9E9E9
| 0 ||  || MBA-M || 17.24 || 2.0 km || multiple || 2002–2021 || 03 Dec 2021 || 140 || align=left | Disc.: NEATAlt.: 2012 UN86 || 
|- id="2002 RR241" bgcolor=#fefefe
| 1 ||  || MBA-I || 18.5 || data-sort-value="0.59" | 590 m || multiple || 2002–2021 || 18 Jan 2021 || 41 || align=left | Disc.: NEAT || 
|- id="2002 RV241" bgcolor=#E9E9E9
| 3 ||  || MBA-M || 18.6 || data-sort-value="0.80" | 800 m || multiple || 2002–2019 || 05 Nov 2019 || 50 || align=left | Disc.: NEAT || 
|- id="2002 RM242" bgcolor=#fefefe
| 0 ||  || MBA-I || 17.78 || 1.7 km || multiple || 2002–2021 || 02 Oct 2021 || 92 || align=left | Disc.: NEAT || 
|- id="2002 RX243" bgcolor=#E9E9E9
| 2 ||  || MBA-M || 18.5 || data-sort-value="0.59" | 590 m || multiple || 2002–2018 || 12 Jul 2018 || 25 || align=left | Disc.: NEAT || 
|- id="2002 RB244" bgcolor=#E9E9E9
| 0 ||  || MBA-M || 17.41 || data-sort-value="0.98" | 980 m || multiple || 2002–2021 || 08 May 2021 || 78 || align=left | Disc.: NEAT || 
|- id="2002 RD244" bgcolor=#FA8072
| 1 ||  || MCA || 19.1 || data-sort-value="0.45" | 450 m || multiple || 2002–2015 || 02 Nov 2015 || 70 || align=left | Disc.: NEATAlt.: 2015 OO39 || 
|- id="2002 RH244" bgcolor=#E9E9E9
| 0 ||  || MBA-M || 18.53 || 1.1 km || multiple || 2002–2021 || 07 Nov 2021 || 48 || align=left | Disc.: NEAT || 
|- id="2002 RK244" bgcolor=#E9E9E9
| 1 ||  || MBA-M || 18.2 || data-sort-value="0.68" | 680 m || multiple || 2002–2019 || 19 Nov 2019 || 37 || align=left | Disc.: NEAT || 
|- id="2002 RM244" bgcolor=#E9E9E9
| 2 ||  || MBA-M || 18.3 || data-sort-value="0.92" | 920 m || multiple || 2002–2019 || 04 Nov 2019 || 78 || align=left | Disc.: NEAT || 
|- id="2002 RN244" bgcolor=#fefefe
| 0 ||  || MBA-I || 17.7 || data-sort-value="0.86" | 860 m || multiple || 2002–2020 || 17 Dec 2020 || 206 || align=left | Disc.: NEAT || 
|- id="2002 RA245" bgcolor=#E9E9E9
| 0 ||  || MBA-M || 17.72 || 1.6 km || multiple || 2002–2022 || 25 Jan 2022 || 79 || align=left | Disc.: NEAT || 
|- id="2002 RB245" bgcolor=#fefefe
| 0 ||  || MBA-I || 18.48 || data-sort-value="0.60" | 600 m || multiple || 2002–2022 || 25 Jan 2022 || 97 || align=left | Disc.: NEAT || 
|- id="2002 RM245" bgcolor=#E9E9E9
| 3 ||  || MBA-M || 18.2 || data-sort-value="0.96" | 960 m || multiple || 2002–2015 || 24 Jun 2015 || 27 || align=left | Disc.: NEAT || 
|- id="2002 RR245" bgcolor=#FA8072
| 0 ||  || MCA || 19.41 || data-sort-value="0.39" | 390 m || multiple || 2002–2019 || 24 Oct 2019 || 61 || align=left | Disc.: NEAT || 
|- id="2002 RT245" bgcolor=#E9E9E9
| 0 ||  || MBA-M || 18.1 || 1.0 km || multiple || 2002–2019 || 25 Oct 2019 || 72 || align=left | Disc.: NEATAlt.: 2015 TN289 || 
|- id="2002 RV245" bgcolor=#E9E9E9
| 0 ||  || MBA-M || 17.7 || 1.2 km || multiple || 2002–2021 || 16 Jan 2021 || 84 || align=left | Disc.: NEATAlt.: 2011 ST231 || 
|- id="2002 RX245" bgcolor=#d6d6d6
| 0 ||  || MBA-O || 18.86 || data-sort-value="0.92" | 920 m || multiple || 2002-2022 || 27 Sep 2022 || 55 || align=left | Disc.: NEAT || 
|- id="2002 RZ245" bgcolor=#d6d6d6
| 0 ||  || MBA-O || 17.2 || 2.0 km || multiple || 2002–2019 || 03 Oct 2019 || 51 || align=left | Disc.: NEATAlt.: 2008 TU219, 2014 WG222 || 
|- id="2002 RD246" bgcolor=#E9E9E9
| 0 ||  || MBA-M || 17.21 || 1.1 km || multiple || 2002–2021 || 12 May 2021 || 152 || align=left | Disc.: NEATAlt.: 2013 GY129 || 
|- id="2002 RS246" bgcolor=#fefefe
| 0 ||  || MBA-I || 18.50 || data-sort-value="0.59" | 590 m || multiple || 2002–2021 || 07 Apr 2021 || 63 || align=left | Disc.: NEATAlt.: 2012 SF60 || 
|- id="2002 RT246" bgcolor=#E9E9E9
| 0 ||  || MBA-M || 17.6 || 1.3 km || multiple || 2002–2021 || 15 Jan 2021 || 64 || align=left | Disc.: NEAT || 
|- id="2002 RD247" bgcolor=#E9E9E9
| 0 ||  || MBA-M || 16.37 || 1.6 km || multiple || 2002–2021 || 14 Apr 2021 || 147 || align=left | Disc.: NEATAlt.: 2017 FY8 || 
|- id="2002 RG247" bgcolor=#fefefe
| 0 ||  || MBA-I || 18.74 || data-sort-value="0.53" | 530 m || multiple || 2002–2021 || 26 Nov 2021 || 91 || align=left | Disc.: NEAT || 
|- id="2002 RS247" bgcolor=#fefefe
| 0 ||  || MBA-I || 18.34 || data-sort-value="0.64" | 640 m || multiple || 2002–2021 || 03 Dec 2021 || 100 || align=left | Disc.: NEAT || 
|- id="2002 RT247" bgcolor=#E9E9E9
| 0 ||  || MBA-M || 17.3 || 1.5 km || multiple || 2000–2020 || 16 Dec 2020 || 111 || align=left | Disc.: NEATAlt.: 2014 HW152 || 
|- id="2002 RY247" bgcolor=#fefefe
| 0 ||  || MBA-I || 17.8 || data-sort-value="0.82" | 820 m || multiple || 2002–2021 || 08 Jun 2021 || 108 || align=left | Disc.: NEATAlt.: 2012 SD13 || 
|- id="2002 RA248" bgcolor=#fefefe
| 0 ||  || MBA-I || 17.6 || data-sort-value="0.90" | 900 m || multiple || 2002–2021 || 18 Jan 2021 || 160 || align=left | Disc.: AMOS || 
|- id="2002 RH248" bgcolor=#FA8072
| – ||  || MCA || 20.3 || data-sort-value="0.26" | 260 m || single || 18 days || 16 Sep 2002 || 10 || align=left | Disc.: NEAT || 
|- id="2002 RL248" bgcolor=#E9E9E9
| 0 ||  || MBA-M || 17.4 || 1.4 km || multiple || 2002–2020 || 11 Dec 2020 || 85 || align=left | Disc.: NEAT || 
|- id="2002 RN248" bgcolor=#d6d6d6
| 0 ||  || MBA-O || 16.28 || 3.1 km || multiple || 2002–2021 || 01 Jun 2021 || 127 || align=left | Disc.: AMOS || 
|- id="2002 RU248" bgcolor=#E9E9E9
| 0 ||  || MBA-M || 17.2 || 1.5 km || multiple || 1997–2020 || 15 Dec 2020 || 142 || align=left | Disc.: NEAT || 
|- id="2002 RX248" bgcolor=#fefefe
| 0 ||  || MBA-I || 18.38 || data-sort-value="0.63" | 630 m || multiple || 2002–2021 || 08 Apr 2021 || 84 || align=left | Disc.: NEAT || 
|- id="2002 RZ248" bgcolor=#E9E9E9
| 0 ||  || MBA-M || 18.6 || 580 m || multiple || 2002-2020 || 06 Dec 2020 || 88 || align=left | Disc.: Xinglong Stn. || 
|- id="2002 RA249" bgcolor=#fefefe
| 0 ||  || MBA-I || 18.4 || data-sort-value="0.62" | 620 m || multiple || 2002–2021 || 08 Jan 2021 || 109 || align=left | Disc.: NEAT || 
|- id="2002 RG249" bgcolor=#E9E9E9
| 0 ||  || MBA-M || 18.1 || 1.0 km || multiple || 2002–2019 || 22 Oct 2019 || 76 || align=left | Disc.: NEATAlt.: 2015 VR101 || 
|- id="2002 RL249" bgcolor=#fefefe
| 0 ||  || MBA-I || 19.18 || data-sort-value="0.43" | 430 m || multiple || 2002–2021 || 08 Sep 2021 || 105 || align=left | Disc.: NEAT || 
|- id="2002 RV249" bgcolor=#E9E9E9
| 0 ||  || MBA-M || 18.2 || data-sort-value="0.96" | 960 m || multiple || 2002–2020 || 11 Nov 2020 || 62 || align=left | Disc.: NEAT || 
|- id="2002 RX249" bgcolor=#E9E9E9
| 0 ||  || MBA-M || 17.7 || data-sort-value="0.86" | 860 m || multiple || 2002–2020 || 27 Jan 2020 || 77 || align=left | Disc.: NEATAlt.: 2014 OU177 || 
|- id="2002 RA250" bgcolor=#E9E9E9
| – ||  || MBA-M || 18.8 || data-sort-value="0.52" | 520 m || single || 21 days || 18 Sep 2002 || 9 || align=left | Disc.: NEAT || 
|- id="2002 RF250" bgcolor=#fefefe
| – ||  || MBA-I || 19.1 || data-sort-value="0.45" | 450 m || single || 9 days || 14 Sep 2002 || 9 || align=left | Disc.: NEAT || 
|- id="2002 RM250" bgcolor=#d6d6d6
| 0 ||  || MBA-O || 16.32 || 3.0 km || multiple || 2002–2022 || 09 Jan 2022 || 149 || align=left | Disc.: NEATAlt.: 2010 FR43 || 
|- id="2002 RC251" bgcolor=#E9E9E9
| 0 ||  || MBA-M || 17.67 || data-sort-value="0.87" | 870 m || multiple || 2002–2021 || 17 Apr 2021 || 55 || align=left | Disc.: NEATAlt.: 2002 TF353 || 
|- id="2002 RD251" bgcolor=#fefefe
| 0 ||  || MBA-I || 18.8 || data-sort-value="0.52" | 520 m || multiple || 1999–2021 || 11 Jun 2021 || 90 || align=left | Disc.: NEAT || 
|- id="2002 RE251" bgcolor=#E9E9E9
| 0 ||  || MBA-M || 16.5 || 2.1 km || multiple || 2002–2021 || 16 Jan 2021 || 121 || align=left | Disc.: NEATAlt.: 2013 CZ138 || 
|- id="2002 RG251" bgcolor=#fefefe
| 1 ||  || MBA-I || 18.7 || data-sort-value="0.54" | 540 m || multiple || 1995–2019 || 03 Jun 2019 || 64 || align=left | Disc.: NEAT || 
|- id="2002 RL251" bgcolor=#E9E9E9
| E ||  || MBA-M || 17.6 || 1.7 km || single || 3 days || 16 Sep 2002 || 10 || align=left | Disc.: NEAT || 
|- id="2002 RQ251" bgcolor=#fefefe
| 0 ||  || MBA-I || 18.4 || data-sort-value="0.62" | 620 m || multiple || 2002–2020 || 22 Sep 2020 || 48 || align=left | Disc.: NEATAdded on 17 January 2021 || 
|- id="2002 RS251" bgcolor=#E9E9E9
| 2 ||  || MBA-M || 19.1 || data-sort-value="0.45" | 450 m || multiple || 2002–2014 || 30 Jul 2014 || 20 || align=left | Disc.: NEATAlt.: 2014 OD153 || 
|- id="2002 RT251" bgcolor=#E9E9E9
| 0 ||  || MBA-M || 18.0 || data-sort-value="0.75" | 750 m || multiple || 1998–2019 || 25 Oct 2019 || 48 || align=left | Disc.: Kitt Peak Obs.Alt.: 2001 FC211 || 
|- id="2002 RV251" bgcolor=#fefefe
| 0 ||  || MBA-I || 18.23 || data-sort-value="0.67" | 670 m || multiple || 2002–2021 || 13 Jul 2021 || 79 || align=left | Disc.: NEATAlt.: 2006 SW206 || 
|- id="2002 RY251" bgcolor=#d6d6d6
| 1 ||  || HIL || 16.4 || 2.9 km || multiple || 2002–2018 || 11 Nov 2018 || 59 || align=left | Disc.: NEAT || 
|- id="2002 RC252" bgcolor=#E9E9E9
| 1 ||  || MBA-M || 18.4 || data-sort-value="0.88" | 880 m || multiple || 2002–2019 || 28 Oct 2019 || 55 || align=left | Disc.: NEAT || 
|- id="2002 RO252" bgcolor=#d6d6d6
| 0 ||  || MBA-O || 16.0 || 3.5 km || multiple || 2002–2021 || 18 Jan 2021 || 169 || align=left | Disc.: NEAT || 
|- id="2002 RT252" bgcolor=#FA8072
| 0 ||  || MCA || 18.9 || data-sort-value="0.49" | 490 m || multiple || 2002–2018 || 04 Nov 2018 || 67 || align=left | Disc.: NEATAlt.: 2015 TQ87 || 
|- id="2002 RX252" bgcolor=#E9E9E9
| 0 ||  || MBA-M || 17.2 || 1.5 km || multiple || 2002–2021 || 09 Jan 2021 || 58 || align=left | Disc.: NEATAlt.: 2015 TK5 || 
|- id="2002 RB253" bgcolor=#E9E9E9
| 3 ||  || MBA-M || 18.6 || data-sort-value="0.57" | 570 m || multiple || 2002–2019 || 28 Nov 2019 || 25 || align=left | Disc.: NEAT || 
|- id="2002 RC253" bgcolor=#d6d6d6
| 0 ||  || MBA-O || 16.4 || 2.9 km || multiple || 2002–2018 || 05 Oct 2018 || 48 || align=left | Disc.: NEATAlt.: 2016 CL62 || 
|- id="2002 RG253" bgcolor=#E9E9E9
| 0 ||  || MBA-M || 17.5 || 1.8 km || multiple || 2002–2020 || 05 Nov 2020 || 87 || align=left | Disc.: NEATAlt.: 2011 SS72 || 
|- id="2002 RH253" bgcolor=#d6d6d6
| 1 ||  || MBA-O || 17.7 || 1.6 km || multiple || 2002–2019 || 08 Jan 2019 || 35 || align=left | Disc.: NEAT || 
|- id="2002 RM253" bgcolor=#E9E9E9
| 0 ||  || MBA-M || 18.08 || data-sort-value="0.72" | 720 m || multiple || 2002–2021 || 14 Apr 2021 || 63 || align=left | Disc.: NEATAlt.: 2006 QY87, 2014 QH315 || 
|- id="2002 RP253" bgcolor=#E9E9E9
| 0 ||  || MBA-M || 17.19 || 2.0 km || multiple || 2002–2021 || 01 Dec 2021 || 140 || align=left | Disc.: NEATAlt.: 2011 QZ29 || 
|- id="2002 RQ253" bgcolor=#fefefe
| 0 ||  || MBA-I || 18.5 || data-sort-value="0.59" | 590 m || multiple || 2002–2020 || 16 Oct 2020 || 70 || align=left | Disc.: NEATAlt.: 2013 RM88 || 
|- id="2002 RT253" bgcolor=#fefefe
| 1 ||  || MBA-I || 18.4 || data-sort-value="0.62" | 620 m || multiple || 2002–2021 || 18 Jan 2021 || 71 || align=left | Disc.: NEAT || 
|- id="2002 RY253" bgcolor=#fefefe
| 1 ||  || MBA-I || 18.9 || data-sort-value="0.49" | 490 m || multiple || 2001–2019 || 28 Nov 2019 || 59 || align=left | Disc.: NEATAlt.: 2009 WH196 || 
|- id="2002 RC254" bgcolor=#d6d6d6
| 0 ||  || MBA-O || 17.09 || 2.1 km || multiple || 1997–2021 || 07 Apr 2021 || 82 || align=left | Disc.: NEAT || 
|- id="2002 RG254" bgcolor=#d6d6d6
| 3 ||  || MBA-O || 17.4 || 1.8 km || multiple || 2002–2018 || 13 Dec 2018 || 17 || align=left | Disc.: NEAT || 
|- id="2002 RH254" bgcolor=#d6d6d6
| 0 ||  || MBA-O || 17.1 || 2.1 km || multiple || 2002–2021 || 11 Jun 2021 || 78 || align=left | Disc.: NEAT || 
|- id="2002 RO254" bgcolor=#d6d6d6
| 0 ||  || MBA-O || 16.3 || 3.1 km || multiple || 2002–2020 || 20 Nov 2020 || 81 || align=left | Disc.: NEATAlt.: 2014 UF168 || 
|- id="2002 RQ254" bgcolor=#E9E9E9
| 0 ||  || MBA-M || 17.3 || 1.5 km || multiple || 1998–2021 || 18 Jan 2021 || 121 || align=left | Disc.: NEATAlt.: 2015 RQ123 || 
|- id="2002 RT254" bgcolor=#d6d6d6
| 0 ||  || MBA-O || 16.5 || 2.8 km || multiple || 2002–2019 || 02 Dec 2019 || 72 || align=left | Disc.: NEAT || 
|- id="2002 RQ255" bgcolor=#E9E9E9
| 0 ||  || MBA-M || 17.3 || 1.5 km || multiple || 2002–2021 || 08 Jan 2021 || 101 || align=left | Disc.: NEATAlt.: 2011 UZ404 || 
|- id="2002 RR255" bgcolor=#E9E9E9
| 4 ||  || MBA-M || 18.0 || data-sort-value="0.75" | 750 m || multiple || 2002–2019 || 05 Nov 2019 || 33 || align=left | Disc.: NEATAlt.: 2019 SH78 || 
|- id="2002 RA256" bgcolor=#fefefe
| 0 ||  || MBA-I || 17.6 || data-sort-value="0.90" | 900 m || multiple || 2002–2021 || 04 Jan 2021 || 90 || align=left | Disc.: NEATAlt.: 2016 TP22 || 
|- id="2002 RB256" bgcolor=#d6d6d6
| 0 ||  || MBA-O || 16.4 || 2.9 km || multiple || 1998–2021 || 16 Jan 2021 || 84 || align=left | Disc.: NEATAlt.: 2007 MH21 || 
|- id="2002 RQ256" bgcolor=#fefefe
| 1 ||  || MBA-I || 18.4 || data-sort-value="0.62" | 620 m || multiple || 2002–2018 || 21 Feb 2018 || 41 || align=left | Disc.: NEATAdded on 24 December 2021 || 
|- id="2002 RU256" bgcolor=#d6d6d6
| 0 ||  || MBA-O || 16.7 || 2.5 km || multiple || 2002–2020 || 27 Apr 2020 || 140 || align=left | Disc.: NEAT || 
|- id="2002 RW256" bgcolor=#E9E9E9
| 0 ||  || MBA-M || 17.6 || data-sort-value="0.90" | 900 m || multiple || 2002–2019 || 02 Nov 2019 || 59 || align=left | Disc.: NEAT || 
|- id="2002 RH257" bgcolor=#fefefe
| 2 ||  || MBA-I || 17.8 || data-sort-value="0.82" | 820 m || multiple || 2002–2019 || 29 Oct 2019 || 24 || align=left | Disc.: NEAT || 
|- id="2002 RK257" bgcolor=#d6d6d6
| 0 ||  || MBA-O || 16.40 || 2.9 km || multiple || 1999–2021 || 11 Apr 2021 || 123 || align=left | Disc.: NEATAlt.: 2016 EJ197 || 
|- id="2002 RN257" bgcolor=#fefefe
| 0 ||  || MBA-I || 17.3 || 1.0 km || multiple || 2002–2020 || 24 Mar 2020 || 102 || align=left | Disc.: NEATAlt.: 2014 WL170 || 
|- id="2002 RP257" bgcolor=#fefefe
| 0 ||  || MBA-I || 18.3 || data-sort-value="0.65" | 650 m || multiple || 2002–2020 || 07 Sep 2020 || 60 || align=left | Disc.: NEAT || 
|- id="2002 RT257" bgcolor=#d6d6d6
| 1 ||  || MBA-O || 17.4 || 1.8 km || multiple || 1997–2020 || 16 Mar 2020 || 35 || align=left | Disc.: NEATAdded on 24 December 2021 || 
|- id="2002 RU257" bgcolor=#E9E9E9
| 0 ||  || MBA-M || 18.39 || data-sort-value="0.62" | 620 m || multiple || 2002–2021 || 07 Feb 2021 || 29 || align=left | Disc.: NEATAdded on 17 June 2021 || 
|- id="2002 RX257" bgcolor=#fefefe
| 1 ||  || MBA-I || 18.6 || data-sort-value="0.57" | 570 m || multiple || 2002–2020 || 15 Sep 2020 || 49 || align=left | Disc.: NEATAdded on 19 October 2020 || 
|- id="2002 RY257" bgcolor=#d6d6d6
| 0 ||  || MBA-O || 16.4 || 2.9 km || multiple || 2002–2021 || 15 Jan 2021 || 92 || align=left | Disc.: NEATAlt.: 2011 GH23, 2013 TL62 || 
|- id="2002 RZ257" bgcolor=#E9E9E9
| 0 ||  || MBA-M || 17.2 || 1.5 km || multiple || 2002–2021 || 06 Jan 2021 || 94 || align=left | Disc.: NEAT || 
|- id="2002 RA258" bgcolor=#d6d6d6
| 0 ||  || MBA-O || 16.76 || 2.5 km || multiple || 1999–2021 || 03 Apr 2021 || 94 || align=left | Disc.: NEATAlt.: 2013 PJ53 || 
|- id="2002 RD258" bgcolor=#fefefe
| – ||  || MBA-I || 20.2 || data-sort-value="0.27" | 270 m || single || 3 days || 16 Sep 2002 || 13 || align=left | Disc.: NEAT || 
|- id="2002 RE258" bgcolor=#fefefe
| 2 ||  || MBA-I || 18.8 || data-sort-value="0.52" | 520 m || multiple || 2002–2019 || 23 Oct 2019 || 41 || align=left | Disc.: NEAT || 
|- id="2002 RG258" bgcolor=#d6d6d6
| 1 ||  || MBA-O || 17.4 || 1.8 km || multiple || 2002–2020 || 26 Jan 2020 || 34 || align=left | Disc.: NEAT || 
|- id="2002 RJ258" bgcolor=#fefefe
| 3 ||  || MBA-I || 18.8 || data-sort-value="0.52" | 520 m || multiple || 2002–2016 || 25 Nov 2016 || 50 || align=left | Disc.: NEATAlt.: 2009 RU17 || 
|- id="2002 RM258" bgcolor=#d6d6d6
| 0 ||  || MBA-O || 17.0 || 2.2 km || multiple || 2002–2018 || 06 Oct 2018 || 61 || align=left | Disc.: NEAT || 
|- id="2002 RW258" bgcolor=#E9E9E9
| 0 ||  || MBA-M || 17.77 || 1.6 km || multiple || 2002–2021 || 06 Nov 2021 || 68 || align=left | Disc.: NEAT || 
|- id="2002 RG259" bgcolor=#E9E9E9
| 1 ||  || MBA-M || 18.4 || 1.2 km || multiple || 2002–2020 || 05 Nov 2020 || 42 || align=left | Disc.: NEAT || 
|- id="2002 RL259" bgcolor=#E9E9E9
| – ||  || MBA-M || 18.5 || data-sort-value="0.59" | 590 m || single || 26 days || 15 Sep 2002 || 12 || align=left | Disc.: NEAT || 
|- id="2002 RO259" bgcolor=#d6d6d6
| 1 ||  || MBA-O || 18.0 || 1.4 km || multiple || 2002–2019 || 19 Dec 2019 || 50 || align=left | Disc.: NEAT || 
|- id="2002 RQ259" bgcolor=#E9E9E9
| 2 ||  || MBA-M || 18.4 || data-sort-value="0.88" | 880 m || multiple || 2002–2019 || 24 Oct 2019 || 39 || align=left | Disc.: NEAT || 
|- id="2002 RT259" bgcolor=#d6d6d6
| 0 ||  || MBA-O || 16.9 || 2.3 km || multiple || 2002–2019 || 27 Oct 2019 || 38 || align=left | Disc.: NEATAdded on 22 July 2020 || 
|- id="2002 RU259" bgcolor=#E9E9E9
| 0 ||  || MBA-M || 17.2 || 1.1 km || multiple || 2002–2019 || 24 Dec 2019 || 107 || align=left | Disc.: NEATAlt.: 2009 DF7 || 
|- id="2002 RY259" bgcolor=#d6d6d6
| 0 ||  || MBA-O || 17.2 || 2.0 km || multiple || 2002–2018 || 17 Aug 2018 || 41 || align=left | Disc.: NEATAlt.: 2008 XR30 || 
|- id="2002 RB260" bgcolor=#fefefe
| 2 ||  || MBA-I || 18.7 || data-sort-value="0.54" | 540 m || multiple || 2002–2021 || 03 Oct 2021 || 62 || align=left | Disc.: NEATAlt.: 2021 PE47 || 
|- id="2002 RD260" bgcolor=#fefefe
| 0 ||  || MBA-I || 17.5 || data-sort-value="0.94" | 940 m || multiple || 2001–2021 || 19 Jan 2021 || 178 || align=left | Disc.: NEAT || 
|- id="2002 RG260" bgcolor=#fefefe
| 1 ||  || MBA-I || 19.0 || data-sort-value="0.47" | 470 m || multiple || 2002–2020 || 18 Oct 2020 || 49 || align=left | Disc.: NEATAdded on 19 October 2020 || 
|- id="2002 RM260" bgcolor=#E9E9E9
| 3 ||  || MBA-M || 19.0 || data-sort-value="0.67" | 670 m || multiple || 2002–2019 || 05 Nov 2019 || 36 || align=left | Disc.: NEAT || 
|- id="2002 RN260" bgcolor=#d6d6d6
| 4 ||  || HIL || 16.4 || 2.9 km || multiple || 2002–2018 || 02 Nov 2018 || 22 || align=left | Disc.: NEAT || 
|- id="2002 RS260" bgcolor=#fefefe
| 0 ||  || MBA-I || 18.64 || data-sort-value="0.56" | 560 m || multiple || 2002–2021 || 08 Sep 2021 || 50 || align=left | Disc.: NEAT Added on 21 August 2021Alt.: 2010 VK33 || 
|- id="2002 RV260" bgcolor=#E9E9E9
| 0 ||  || MBA-M || 17.4 || 1.4 km || multiple || 2002–2021 || 13 Jan 2021 || 110 || align=left | Disc.: NEATAlt.: 2011 UE77 || 
|- id="2002 RC261" bgcolor=#E9E9E9
| 0 ||  || MBA-M || 16.6 || 2.0 km || multiple || 2002–2021 || 11 Jan 2021 || 128 || align=left | Disc.: NEAT || 
|- id="2002 RD261" bgcolor=#d6d6d6
| 0 ||  || MBA-O || 17.28 || 1.9 km || multiple || 2002–2021 || 07 Feb 2021 || 56 || align=left | Disc.: NEATAlt.: 2008 XT27 || 
|- id="2002 RE261" bgcolor=#E9E9E9
| 0 ||  || MBA-M || 17.39 || 1.9 km || multiple || 2002–2021 || 23 Nov 2021 || 71 || align=left | Disc.: NEAT || 
|- id="2002 RJ261" bgcolor=#FA8072
| 1 ||  || MCA || 19.17 || data-sort-value="0.44" | 440 m || multiple || 2002–2021 || 31 Oct 2021 || 27 || align=left | Disc.: NEAT || 
|- id="2002 RN261" bgcolor=#E9E9E9
| 0 ||  || MBA-M || 17.81 || 1.5 km || multiple || 2002–2021 || 09 Nov 2021 || 93 || align=left | Disc.: NEAT || 
|- id="2002 RO261" bgcolor=#fefefe
| 0 ||  || MBA-I || 18.18 || data-sort-value="0.69" | 690 m || multiple || 2002–2021 || 08 May 2021 || 54 || align=left | Disc.: NEATAlt.: 2004 DP56 || 
|- id="2002 RZ261" bgcolor=#E9E9E9
| 0 ||  || MBA-M || 17.7 || data-sort-value="0.86" | 860 m || multiple || 2002–2019 || 28 Nov 2019 || 59 || align=left | Disc.: NEAT || 
|- id="2002 RM262" bgcolor=#fefefe
| 2 ||  || MBA-I || 19.3 || data-sort-value="0.41" | 410 m || multiple || 2002–2015 || 23 Jun 2015 || 44 || align=left | Disc.: NEATAlt.: 2012 QY31 || 
|- id="2002 RR262" bgcolor=#E9E9E9
| 0 ||  || MBA-M || 17.1 || 1.6 km || multiple || 2002–2019 || 29 Oct 2019 || 94 || align=left | Disc.: NEAT || 
|- id="2002 RT262" bgcolor=#E9E9E9
| 0 ||  || MBA-M || 17.9 || data-sort-value="0.78" | 780 m || multiple || 2002–2020 || 22 Mar 2020 || 75 || align=left | Disc.: NEAT || 
|- id="2002 RV262" bgcolor=#d6d6d6
| E ||  || MBA-O || 18.0 || 1.4 km || single || 3 days || 14 Sep 2002 || 9 || align=left | Disc.: NEAT || 
|- id="2002 RX262" bgcolor=#d6d6d6
| – ||  || MBA-O || 17.4 || 1.8 km || single || 5 days || 18 Sep 2002 || 8 || align=left | Disc.: NEAT || 
|- id="2002 RY262" bgcolor=#d6d6d6
| 0 ||  || MBA-O || 16.6 || 2.7 km || multiple || 2002–2019 || 03 Dec 2019 || 104 || align=left | Disc.: NEATAlt.: 2012 HV44 || 
|}
back to top

References 
 

Lists of unnumbered minor planets